= History of art =

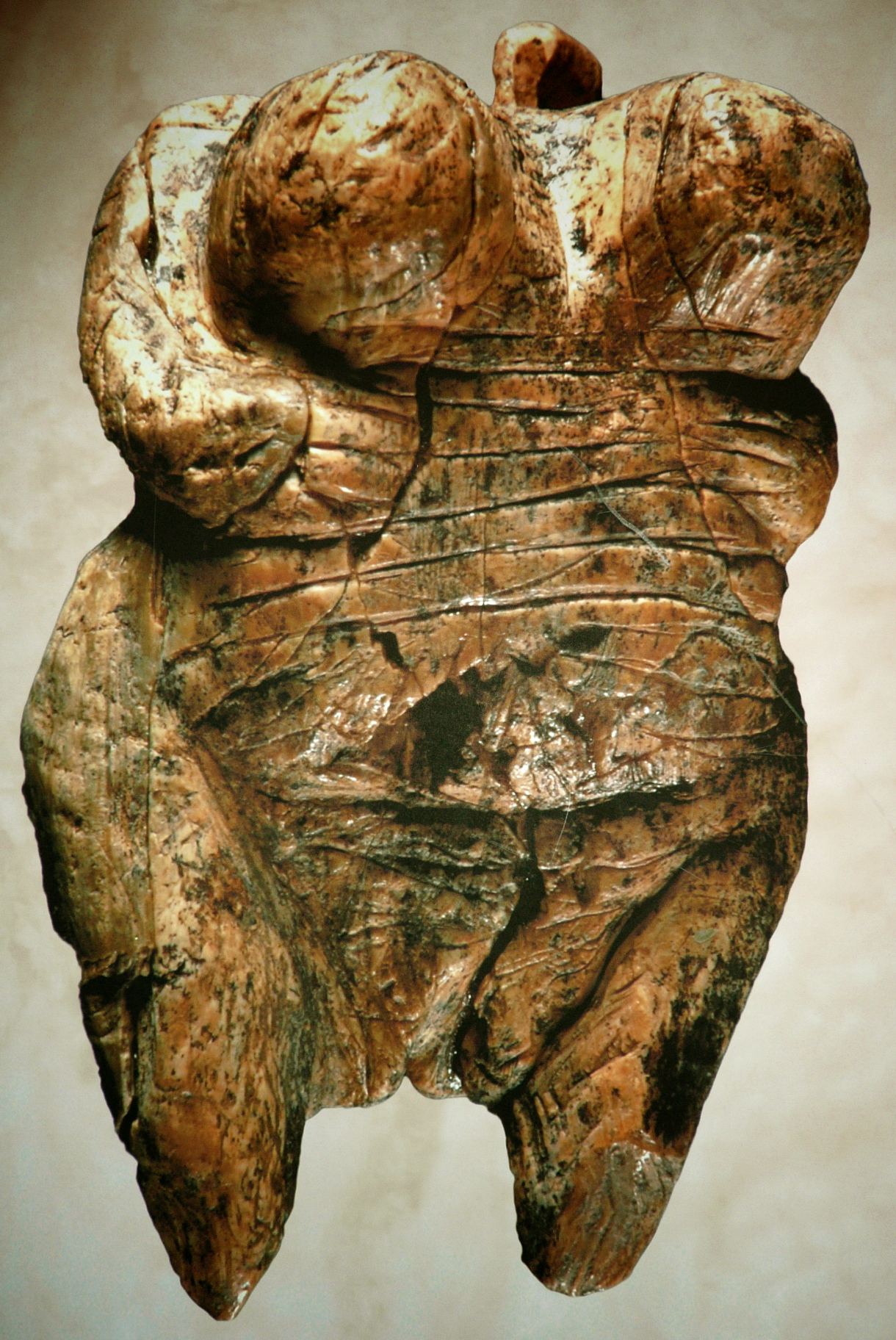
Venus of Hohle Fels

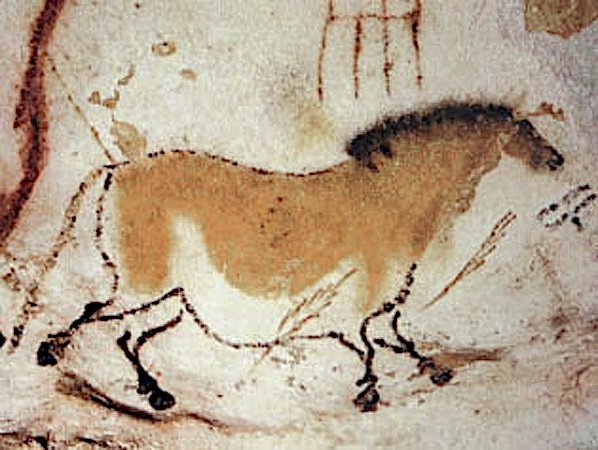
Horse painting from Lascaux cave system

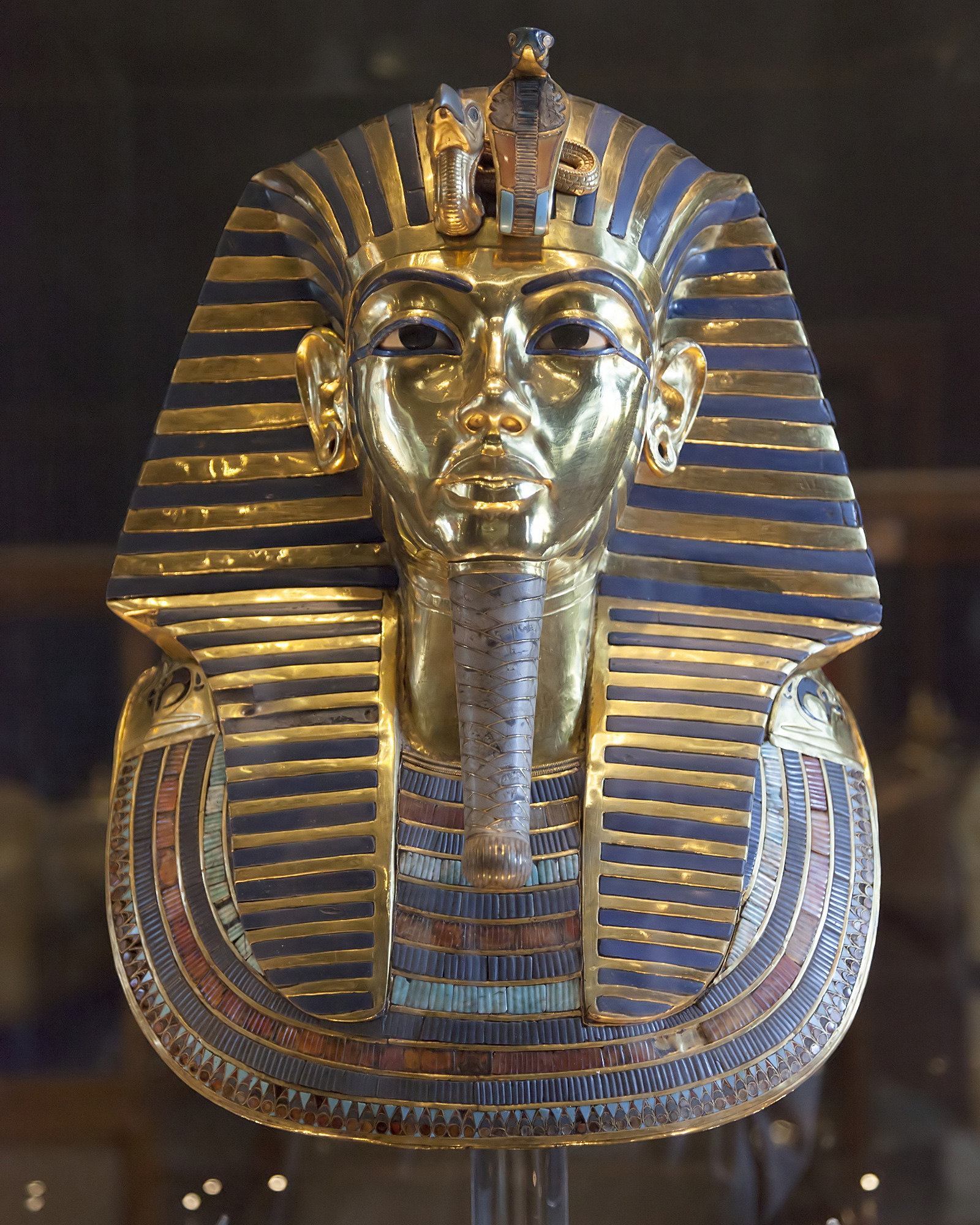
Mask of Tutankhamun

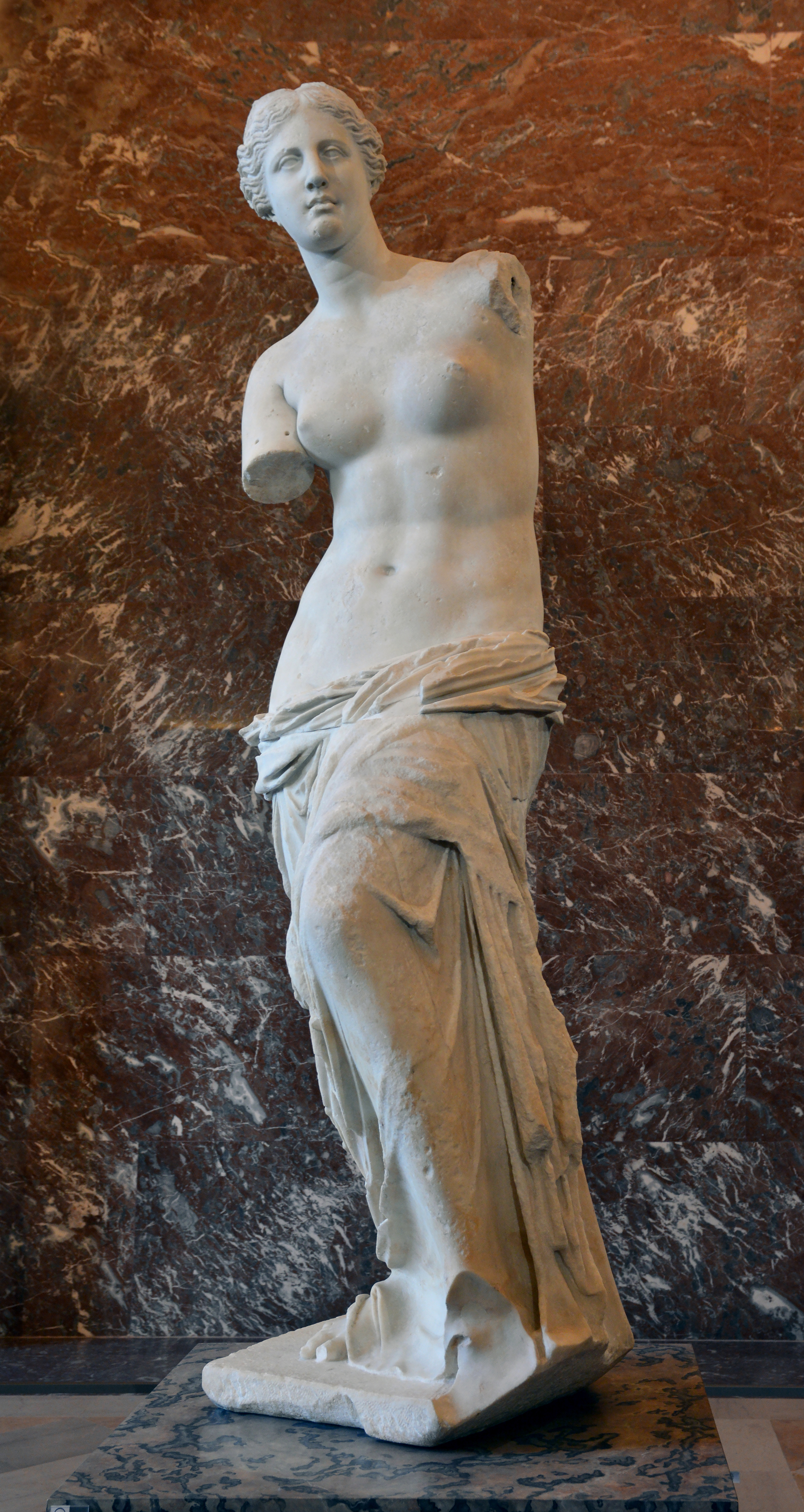
Venus de Milo, Alexandros of Antioch

Mona Lisa, Leonardo da Vinci

Les Demoiselles d'Avignon, Pablo Picasso

The history of art focuses on objects made by humans for any number of spiritual, narrative, philosophical, symbolic, conceptual, documentary, decorative, and even functional and other purposes, though focused on a primary emphasis on its aesthetic visual form.

Visual art can be classified in diverse ways, such as separating fine arts from applied arts; inclusively focusing on human creativity; or focusing on different media such as architecture, sculpture, painting, film, photography, and graphic arts. In recent years, technological advances have led to video art, computer art, performance art, animation, television, and video games.

The history of art is often told as a chronology of masterpieces created during each civilization. It can thus be framed as a story of high culture, epitomized by the Wonders of the World. On the other hand, vernacular art expressions can also be integrated into art historical narratives, referred to as folk arts or craft. The more closely that an art historian engages with these latter forms of low culture, the more likely it is that they will identify their work as examining visual culture or material culture, or as contributing to fields related to art history, such as anthropology or archaeology. In the latter cases, art objects may be referred to as archaeological artifacts.

== Prehistory ==
Prehistoric art includes a broad range of art made by painters and sculptors from early ancient cultures, and includes some of the earliest human artifacts. Among the first art objects are decorative artifacts from Middle Stone Age Africa. Containers from that period have also been discovered in South Africa that may have been used to hold paints dating as far back as 100,000 years ago.

A form of prehistoric art found all over the world, especially in Europe, are small, prehistoric statuettes known as Venus figurines, featuring exaggerated breasts and bellies. The most famous of them include the Venus of Hohle Fels and the Venus of Willendorf, found in Germany and Austria. Most have small heads, wide hips, and legs that taper to a point. Arms and feet are often absent, and the head is usually small and faceless.

The Venus of Hohle Fels is one of the numerous objects found at the Caves and Ice Age Art in the Swabian Jura UNESCO World Heritage Site, where the oldest non-stationary works of human art yet discovered were found, in the form of carved animal and humanoid figurines, in addition to the oldest musical instruments unearthed so far, with the artifacts dating between 43,000 and 35,000 BC.

The best-known prehistoric artworks are the large Paleolithic cave paintings that depict animals in continental Europe, particularly the ones at Lascaux in the Dordogne region of France. Several hundred decorated caves are known, spanning the Upper Paleolithic period (c. 38,000–12,000 BC). There are examples in Ukraine, Italy and Great Britain, but most of them are in France and Spain.

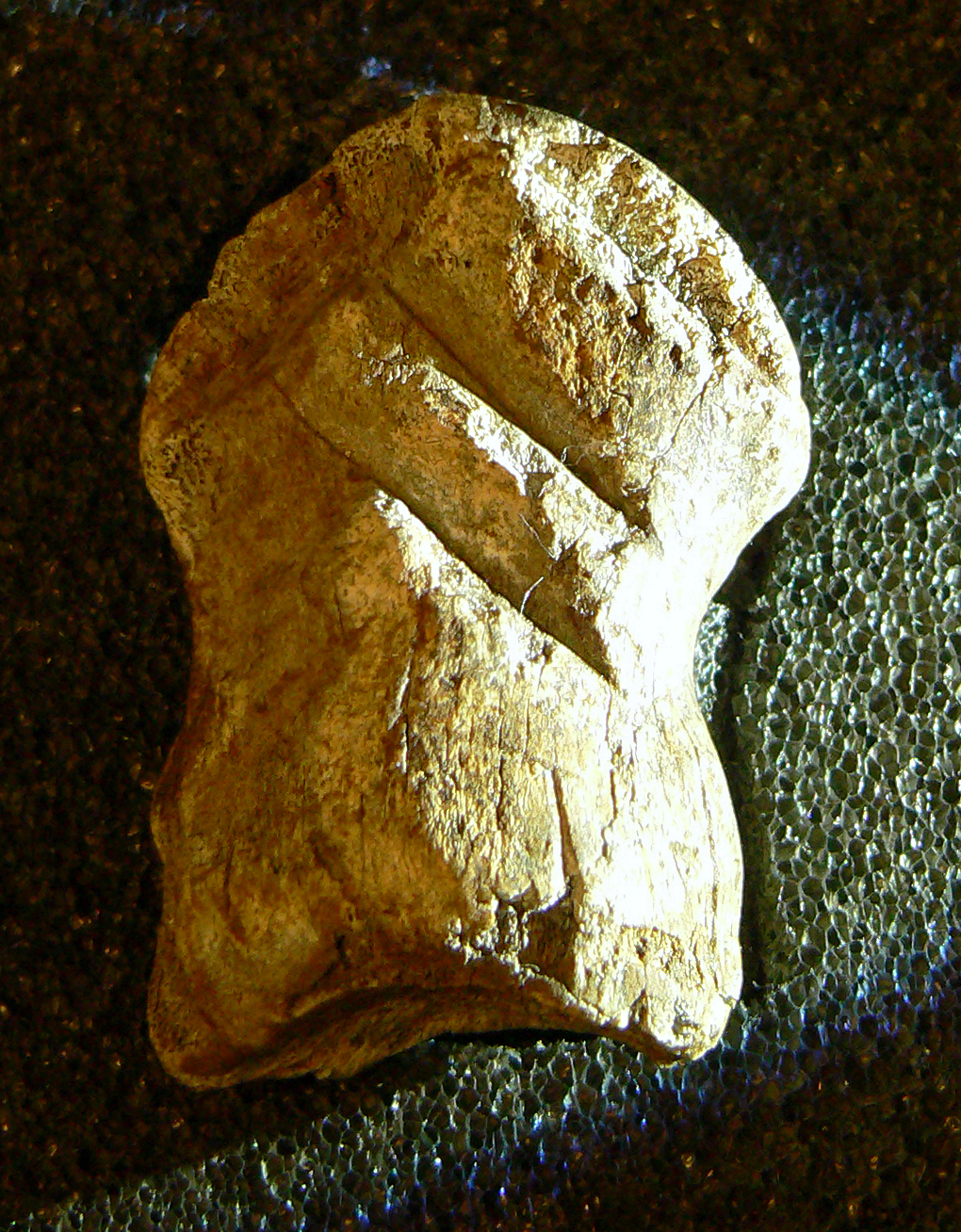
Giant deer bone of Einhornhöhle c. 49,000 BC; Megaloceros bone; Einhornhöhle, Germany

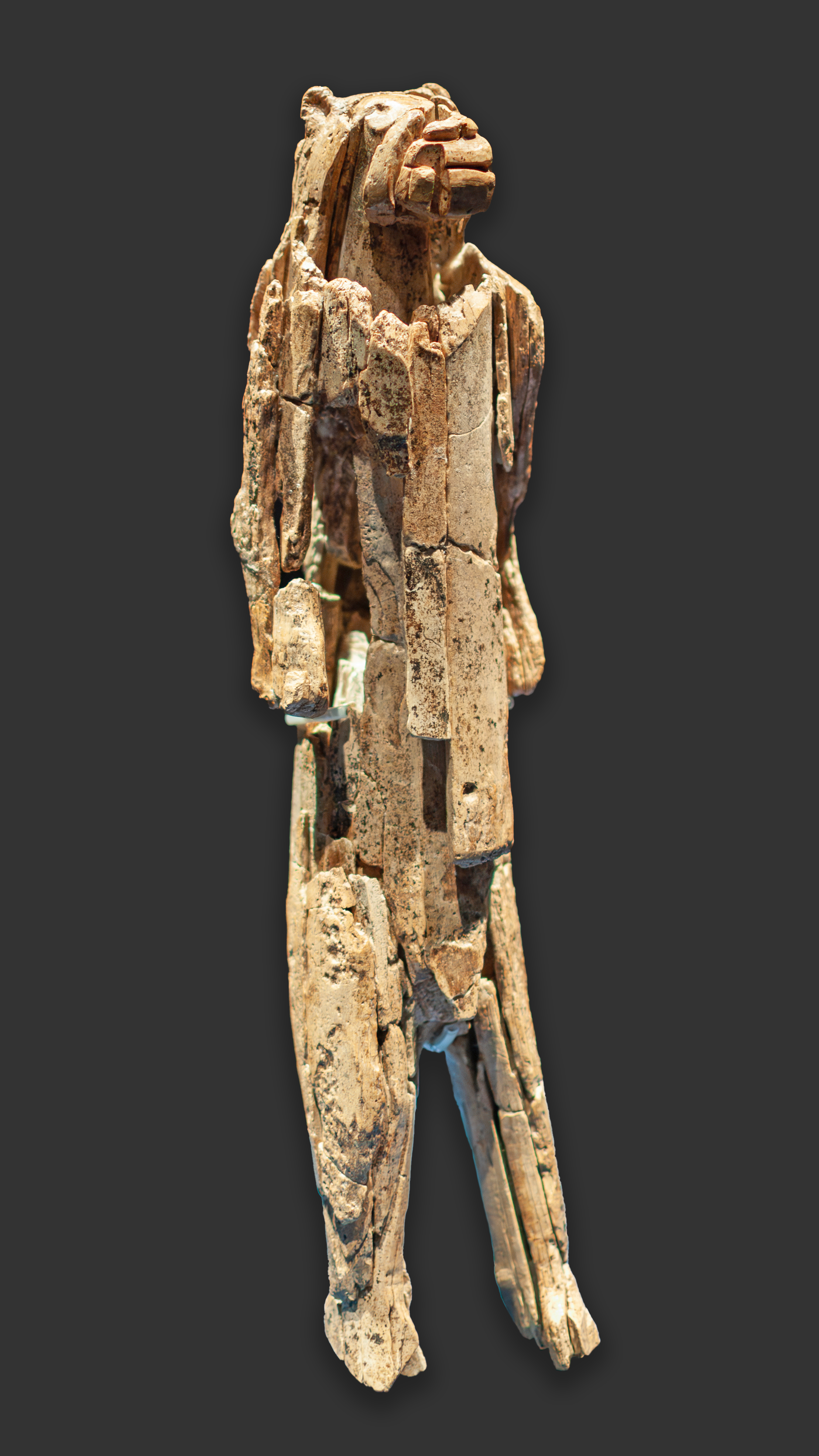
Löwenmensch; c. 41,000–35,000 BC; Hohlenstein-Stadel caves Swabian Jura, Germany

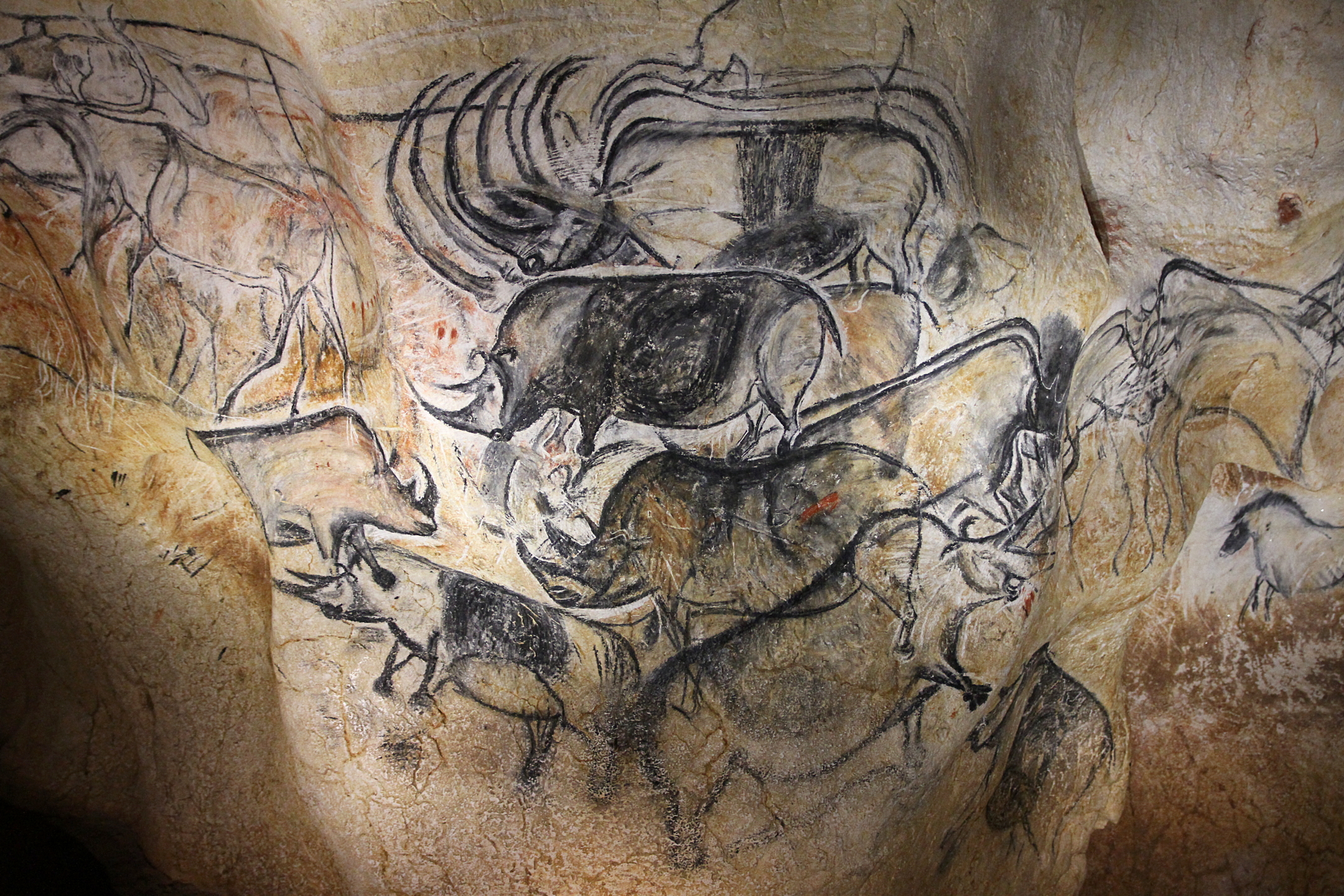
Painting of rhinoceroses; c. 32,000–14,000 BC; charcoal on rock; length: c. 2 m; Chauvet Cave (Ardèche, France)

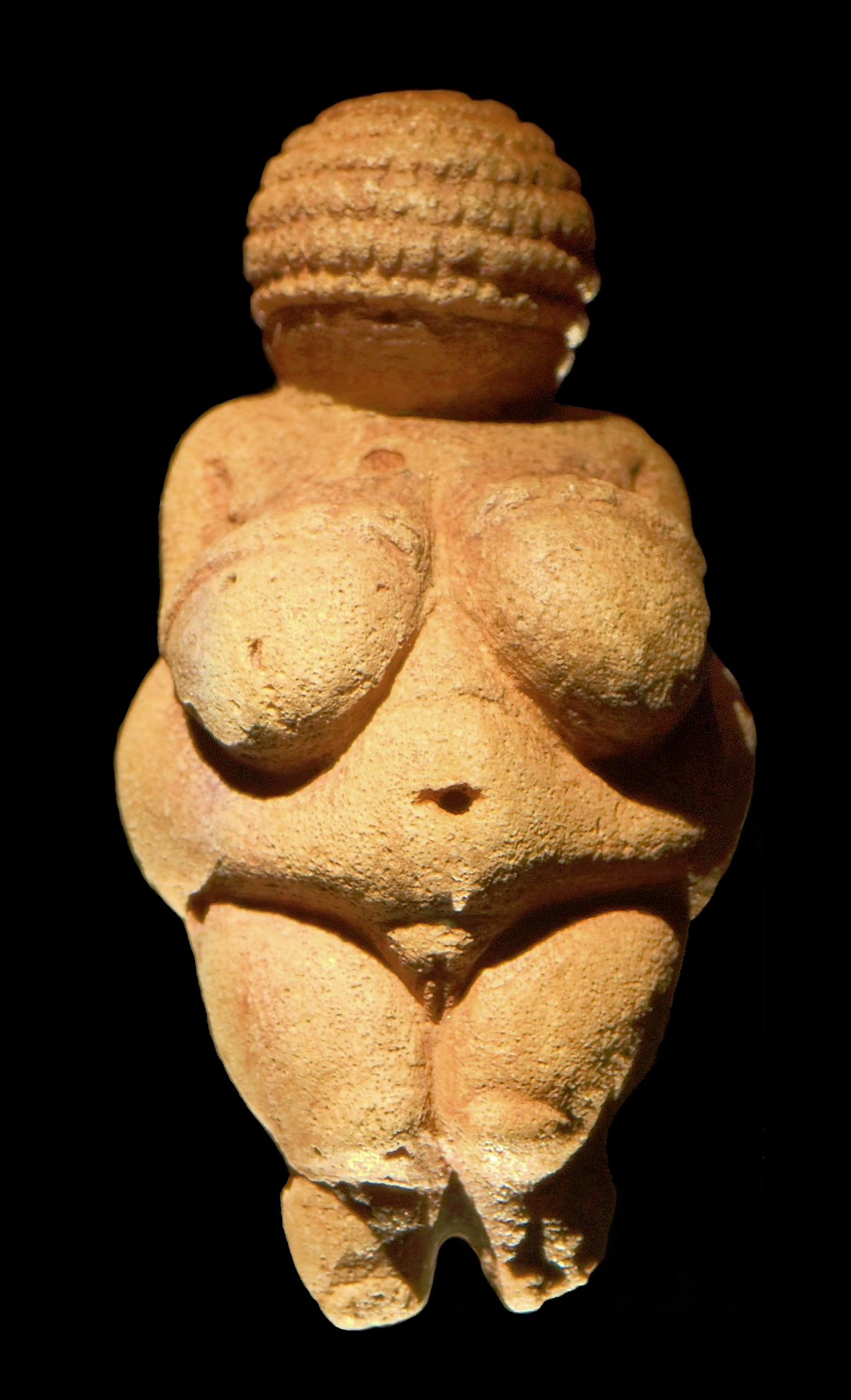
Venus of Willendorf; c. 25,000 BC; limestone with ochre colouring; height: 11 cm; Natural History Museum (Vienna, Austria)

== Antiquity ==
=== Ancient Near East ===
Ancient Near East stretched from Turkey and the Mediterranean seaboard in the west to Iran and the Arabian Peninsula in the east. Over time, multiple civilizations appeared, lived and disappeared here. One of the key regions was Mesopotamia, which witnessed during the 4th millennium BC the emergence of the first cities and the earliest form of writing. Ancient Mesopotamia covers present-day Iraq, and parts of Syria and Turkey. Its northern half forms part of the "Fertile Crescent", where important Neolithic developments such as early farming and permanent village settlements first appeared. Because the region is nested within the Tigris–Euphrates river delta, numerous civilizations lived here, notably Sumer, Akkad, Assyria and Babylonia. Mesopotamian architecture was characterized by the use of bricks, lintels, and cone mosaic. Notable examples are the ziggurats, large temples in the form of step pyramids.

The political, economic, artistic and architectural traditions of the Sumerians lead to the foundation of Western civilization. Multiple things appeared for the first time in Sumer: the first city-state (Uruk), ruled by king Gilgamesh; the first organized religion, based on a hierarchical structure of gods, people and rituals; the first known writing, the cuneiforms; the first irrigation system and the first vehicles with wheels. Cylinder seals appeared here as well, engraved with little inscriptions and illustrations. Another civilization that developed here was the Akkadian Empire, the world's first great empire.

During the early 1st millennium BC, after the Akkadians, an empire called Assyria dominated the entire Middle East, stretching from the Persian Gulf to the Mediterranean Sea. Its cities were filled with impressive buildings and art. Assyrian art is best known for its detailed stone reliefs, depicting scenes of court life, religious practice, hunting and epic battles. These reliefs were initially painted in bright colours and placed in palaces. Besides their beauty, they also depict Assyrian life and views of the world, including Assyrian clothing and furniture.

Later, the Babylonians conquered the Assyrian Empire. During the 6th century BC, Babylon became the largest city in the world. Upon entering Babylon, visitors were greeted with the impressive Ishtar Gate, with its walls covered in vivid blue glazed bricks and reliefs showing dragons, bulls and lions. This gate is named after Ishtar, the goddess of war and love. One of the most famous objects from the Babylonian era is the Code of Hammurabi, a stele depicting the rules and laws of life in the kingdom.

In the mid-6th century BC, after a series of military campaigns, the Babylonian Empire fell to the Achaemenid Empire, ruled by King Cyrus II, stretching across the Middle East and Central Asia, from Egypt to the Indus Valley. Its art incorporates elements from across the empire, celebrating its wealth and power. Persepolis (Iran) was the capital of the empire, and it is full of impressive sculptures showing religious images and people of the empire. There are also the ruins of a palace here, with a big audience hall for receiving guests.

Besides Mesopotamia and Iran, there were Ancient civilizations who produced art and architecture in other regions as well. In Anatolia (present-day Turkey), the Hittite Empire appeared. During Antiquity, South Arabia was important in the production and trade of aromatics, bringing wealth to the kingdoms that were in this region. Before circa 4000 BC, the climate of Arabia was wetter than today. In south-west, several kingdoms appeared, like Saba’. The south Arabian human figure is usually stylized, based on rectangular shapes, but with fine details.

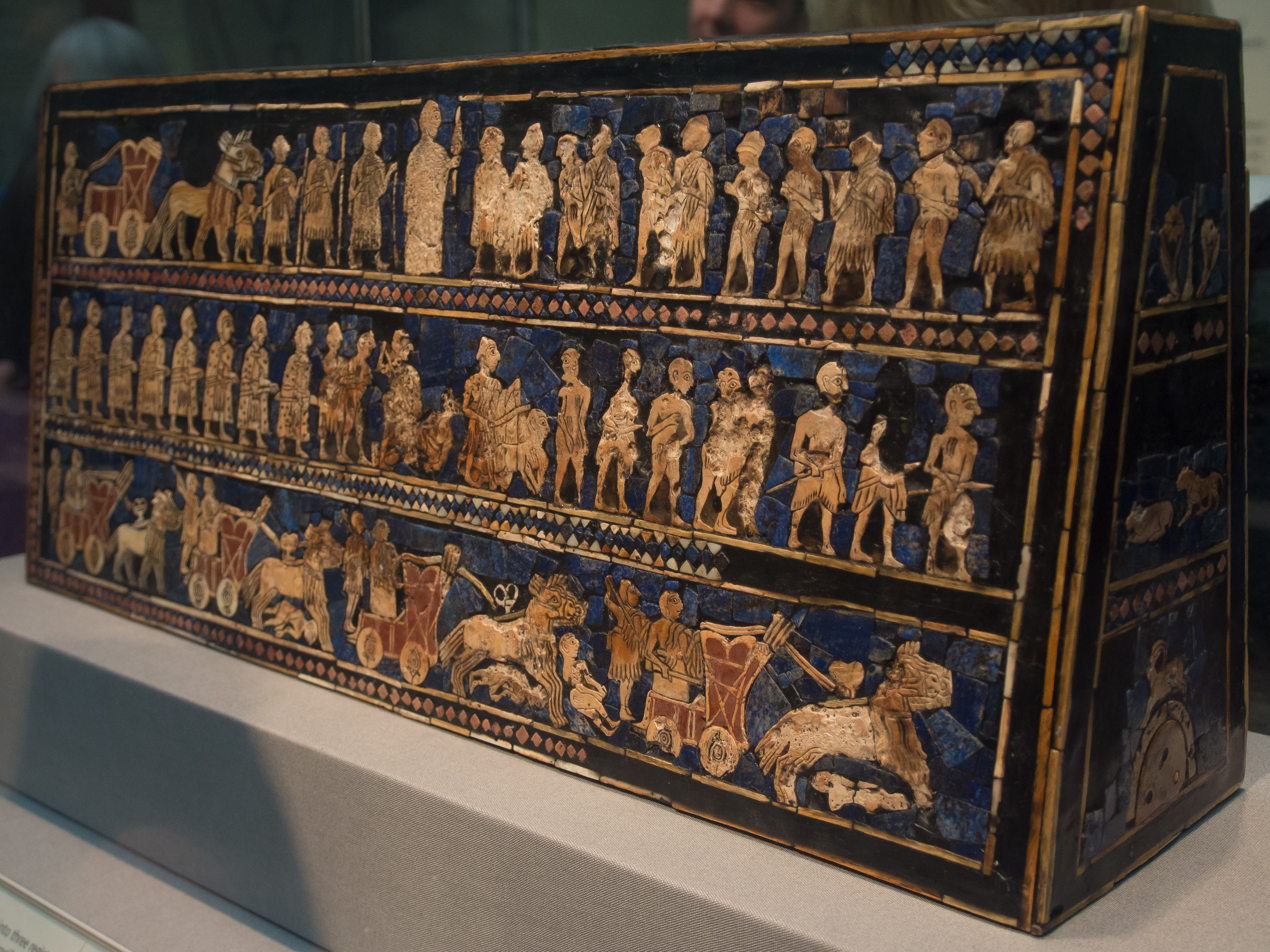
Standard of Ur (Sumerian); c.2600-2400 BC; shell, red limestone and lapis lazuli on wood; length: 49.5 cm; British Museum (London)

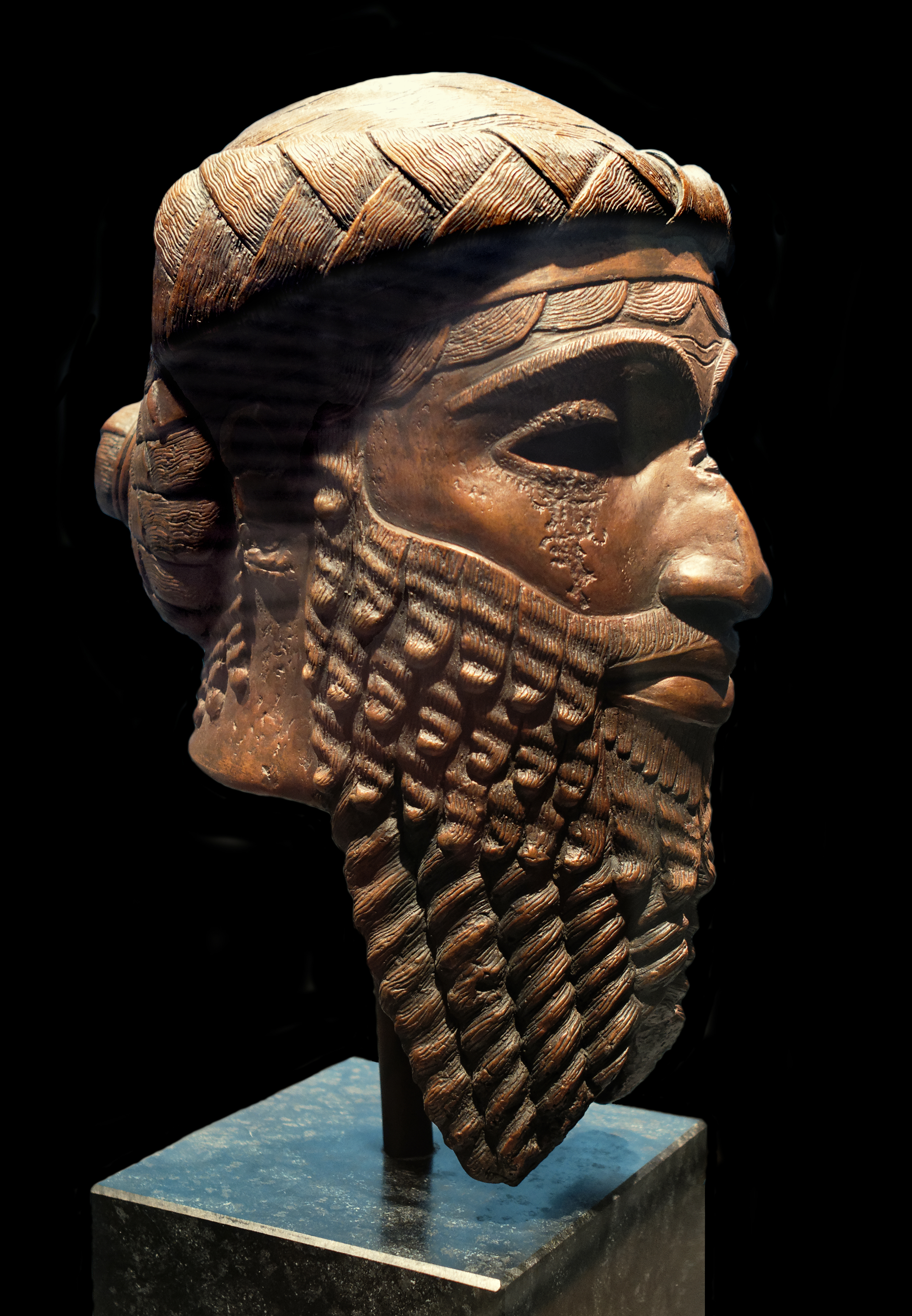
King of Akkad (Akkadian); c. 2250 BC; copper alloy; height: 30 cm; Iraq Museum

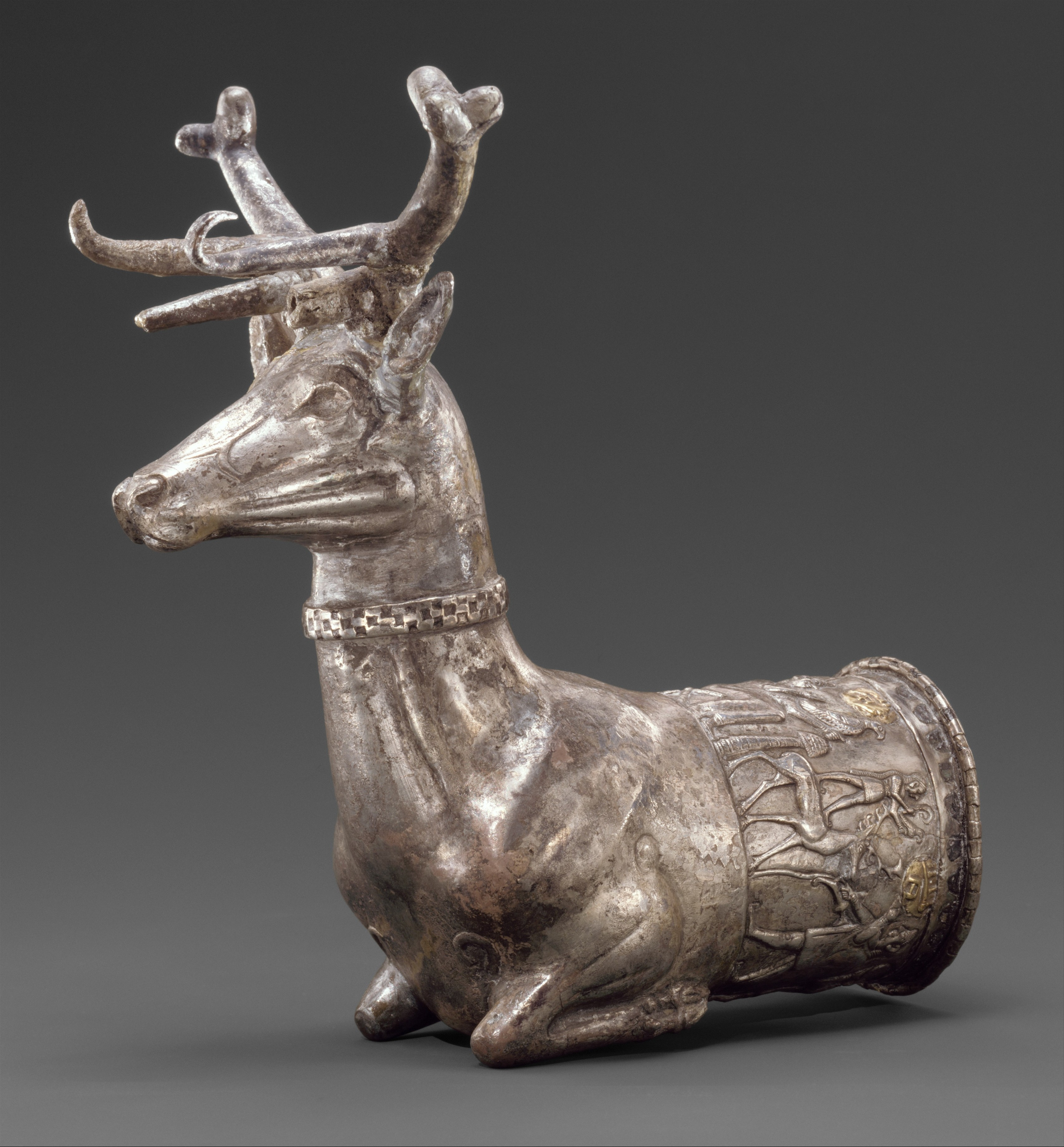
Stag rhyton (Hittite); c.1400-1200 BC; silver with gold inlay; height: 13 cm; Metropolitan Museum of Art (New York City)

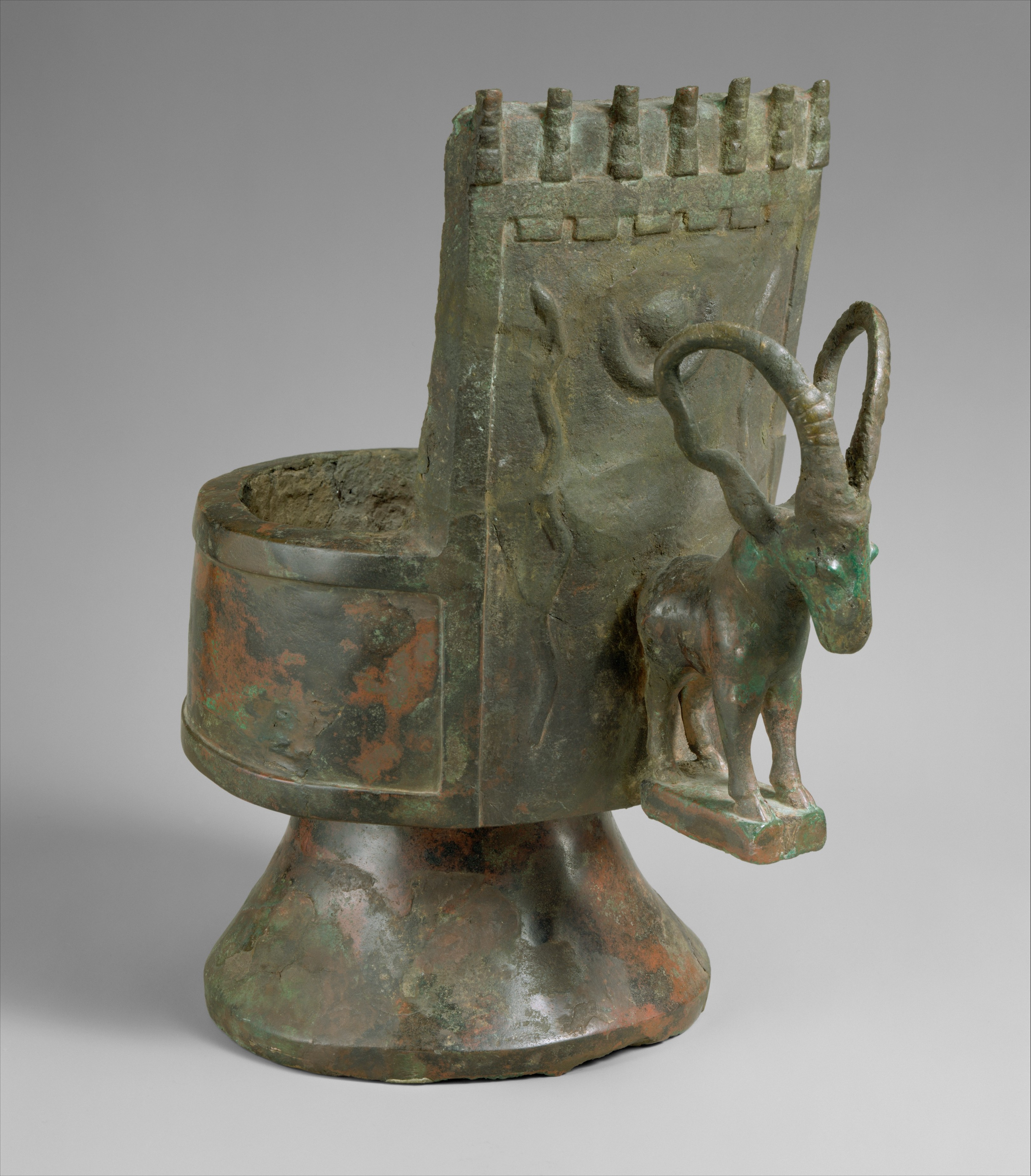
Incense burner (Pre-Islamic South Arabian); c. mid-1st millennium BC; bronze; height: 27.6 cm; Metropolitan Museum of Art

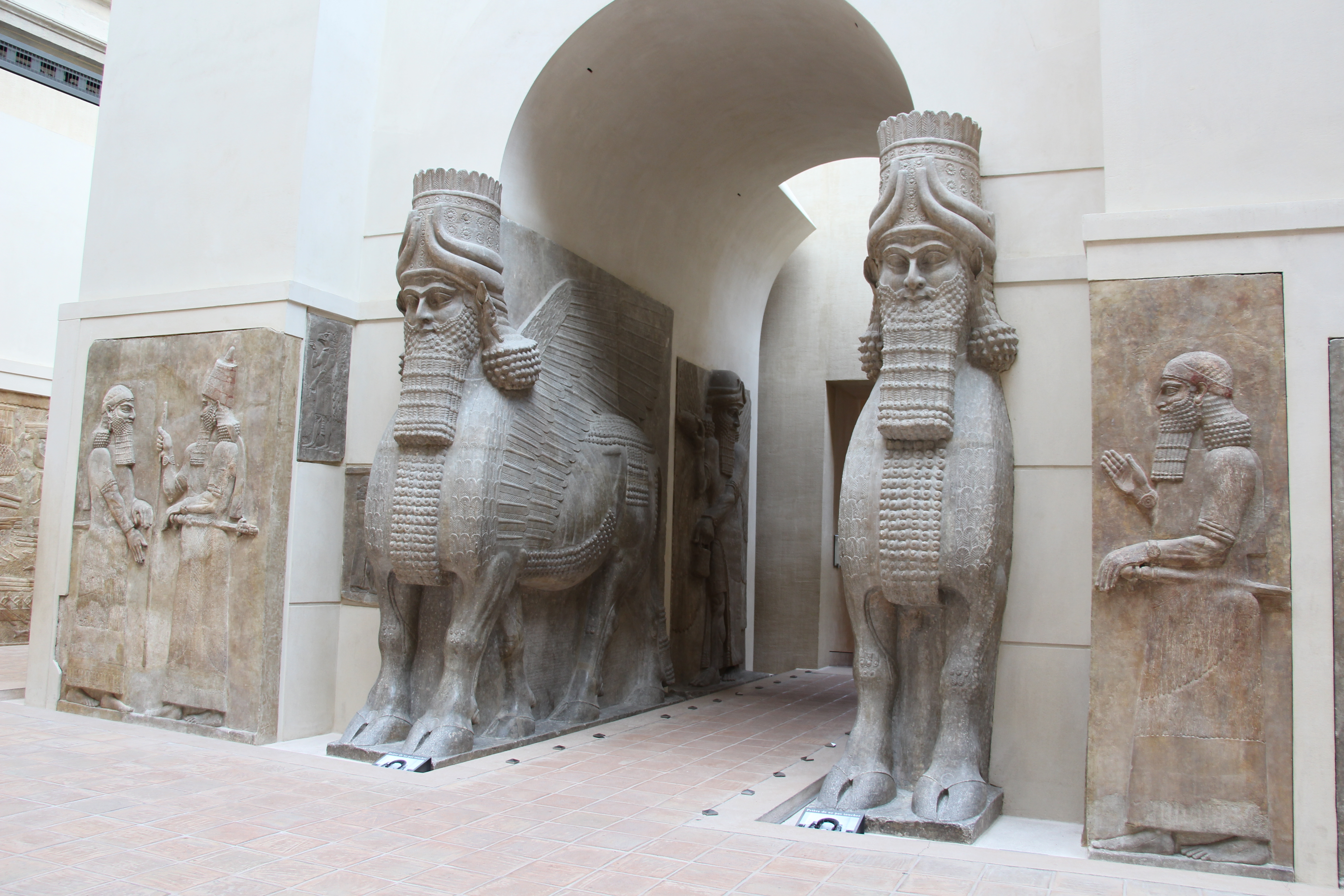
Winged bulls (Neo-Assyrian); c.710 BC; alabaster; height (max): 4.2 m; Louvre

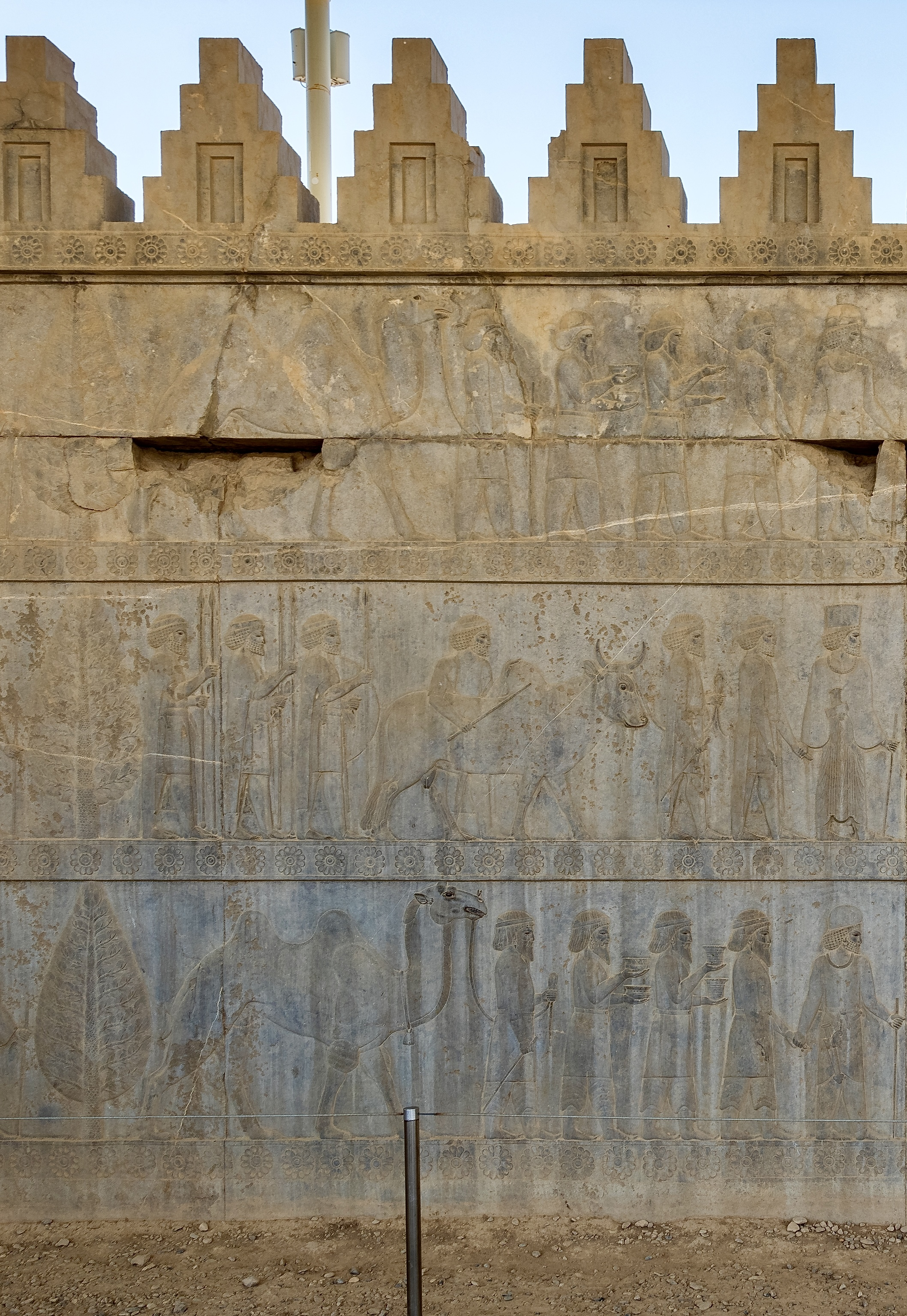
Delegation bearing gifts (Persian Achaemenid); c.490 BC; limestone; c.260 x 150 cm; in situ, Persepolis (Iran)

=== Egypt ===
One of the first great civilizations arose in Egypt, which had elaborate and complex works of art produced by professional artists and craftspeople. Egypt's art was highly religious and symbolic. Given that the culture had a centralized power structure and hierarchy, a great deal of art was created to honour the pharaoh, including great monuments. Egyptian art and culture emphasized the religious concept of immortality. Later Egyptian art includes Coptic and Byzantine art.

The architecture is characterized by monumental structures, built with large stone blocks, lintels, and solid columns. Funerary monuments included mastaba, tombs of rectangular form; pyramids, which included step pyramids (Saqqarah) or smooth-sided pyramids (Giza); and the hypogeum, underground tombs (Valley of the Kings). Other great buildings were the temple, which tended to be monumental complexes preceded by an avenue of sphinxes and obelisks. Temples used pylons and trapezoid walls with hypaethros and hypostyle halls and shrines. The temples of Karnak, Luxor, Philae and Edfu are good examples. Another type of temple is the rock temple, in the form of a hypogeum, found in Abu Simbel and Deir el-Bahari.

Painting of the Egyptian era used a juxtaposition of overlapping planes. The images were represented hierarchically, i.e., the Pharaoh is larger than the common subjects or enemies depicted at his side. Egyptians painted the outline of the head and limbs in profile, while the torso, hands, and eyes were painted from the front. Applied arts were developed in Egypt, in particular woodwork and metalwork. There are superb examples such as cedar furniture inlaid with ebony and ivory which can be seen in the tombs at the Egyptian Museum. Other examples include the pieces found in Tutankhamun's tomb, which are of great artistic value.

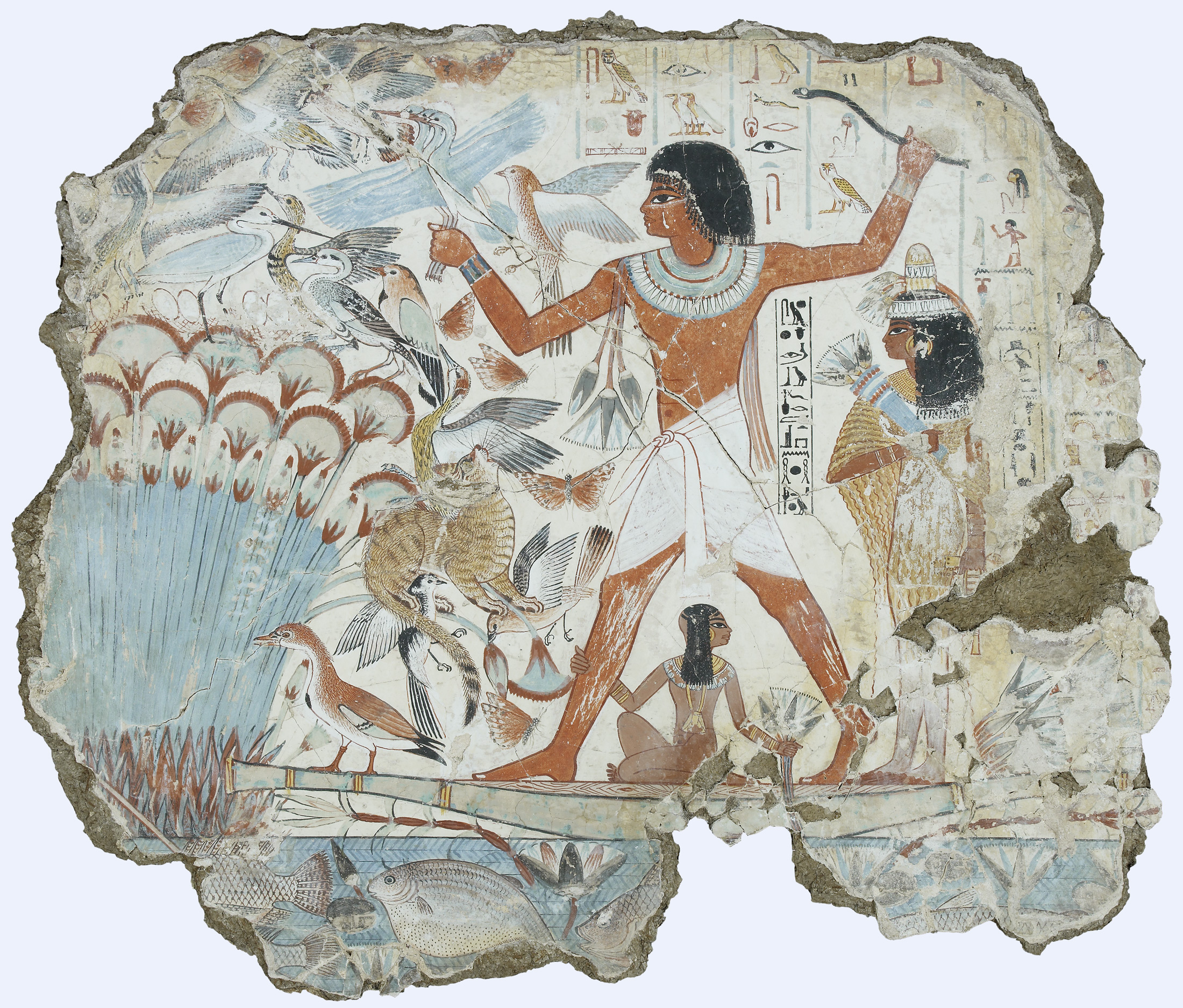
Nebamun Hunting in the Marshes; c. 1380 BC; paint on plaster; 98 × 83 cm; British Museum (London)

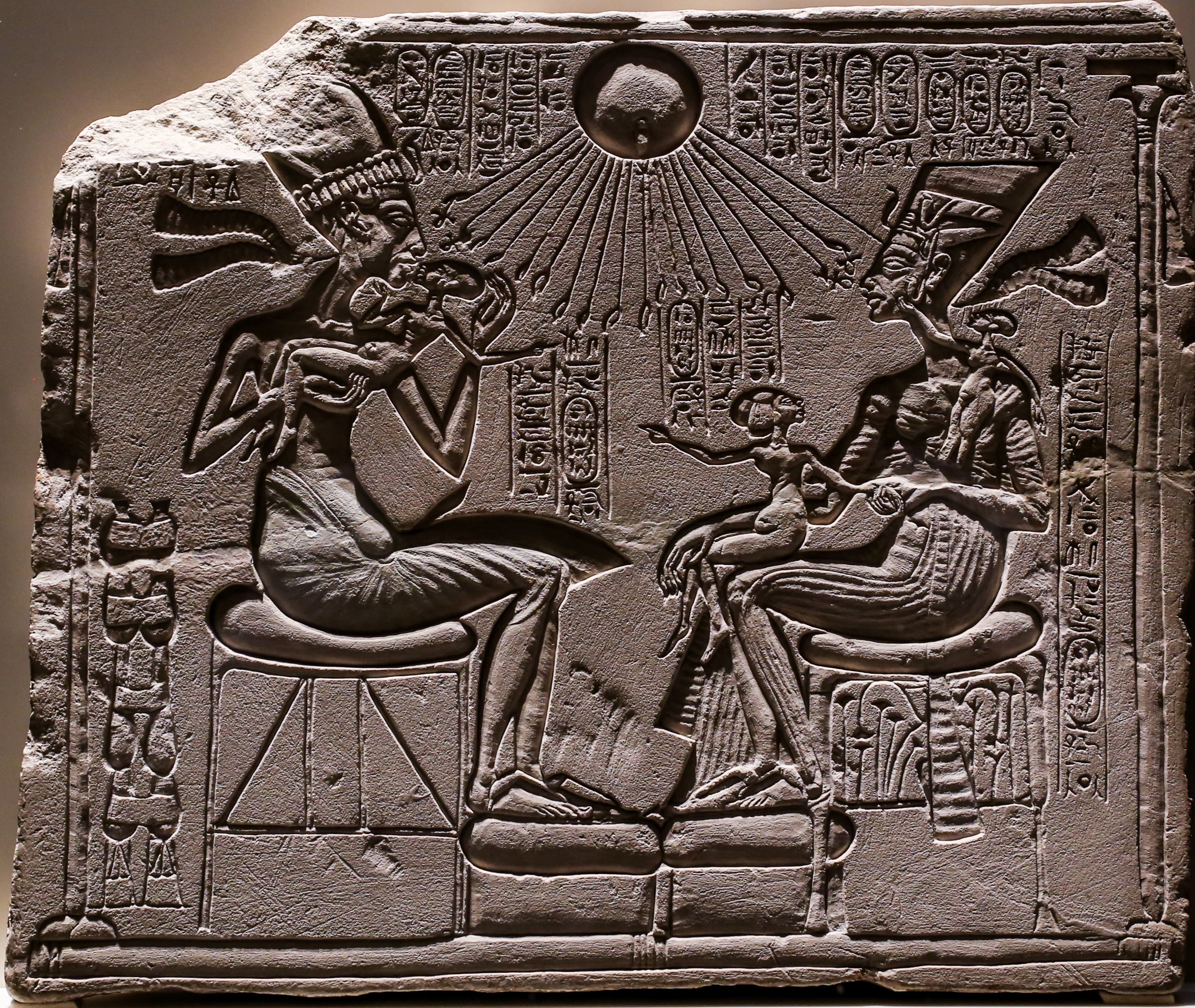
Akhenaten and Nefertiti with Daughters; c.1345 BC; painted limestone; 32.5 x 39 cm; Egyptian Museum of Berlin (Germany)

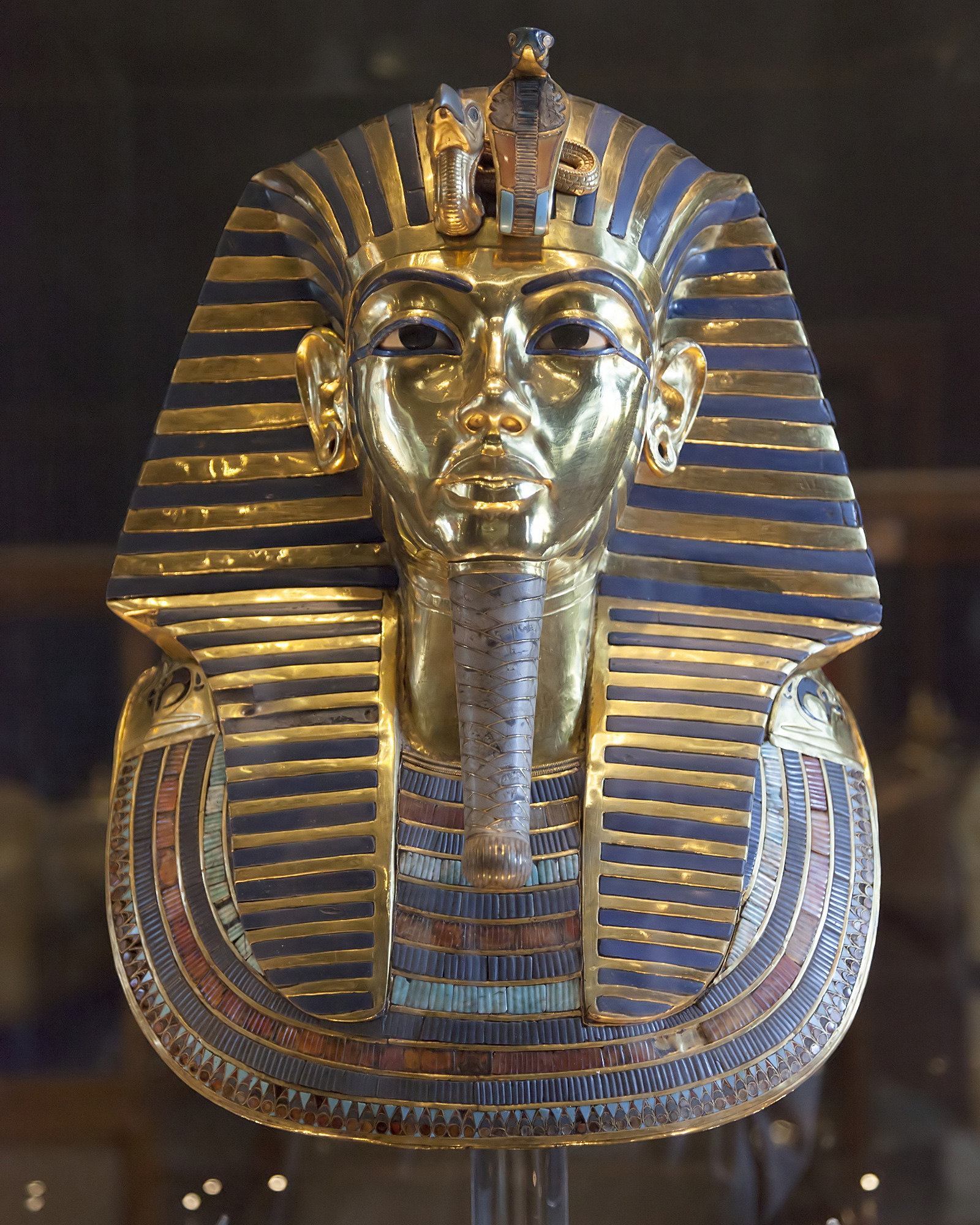
Mask of Tutankhamun; c. 1327 BC; gold, glass and semi-precious stones; height: 54 cm; Egyptian Museum (Cairo)

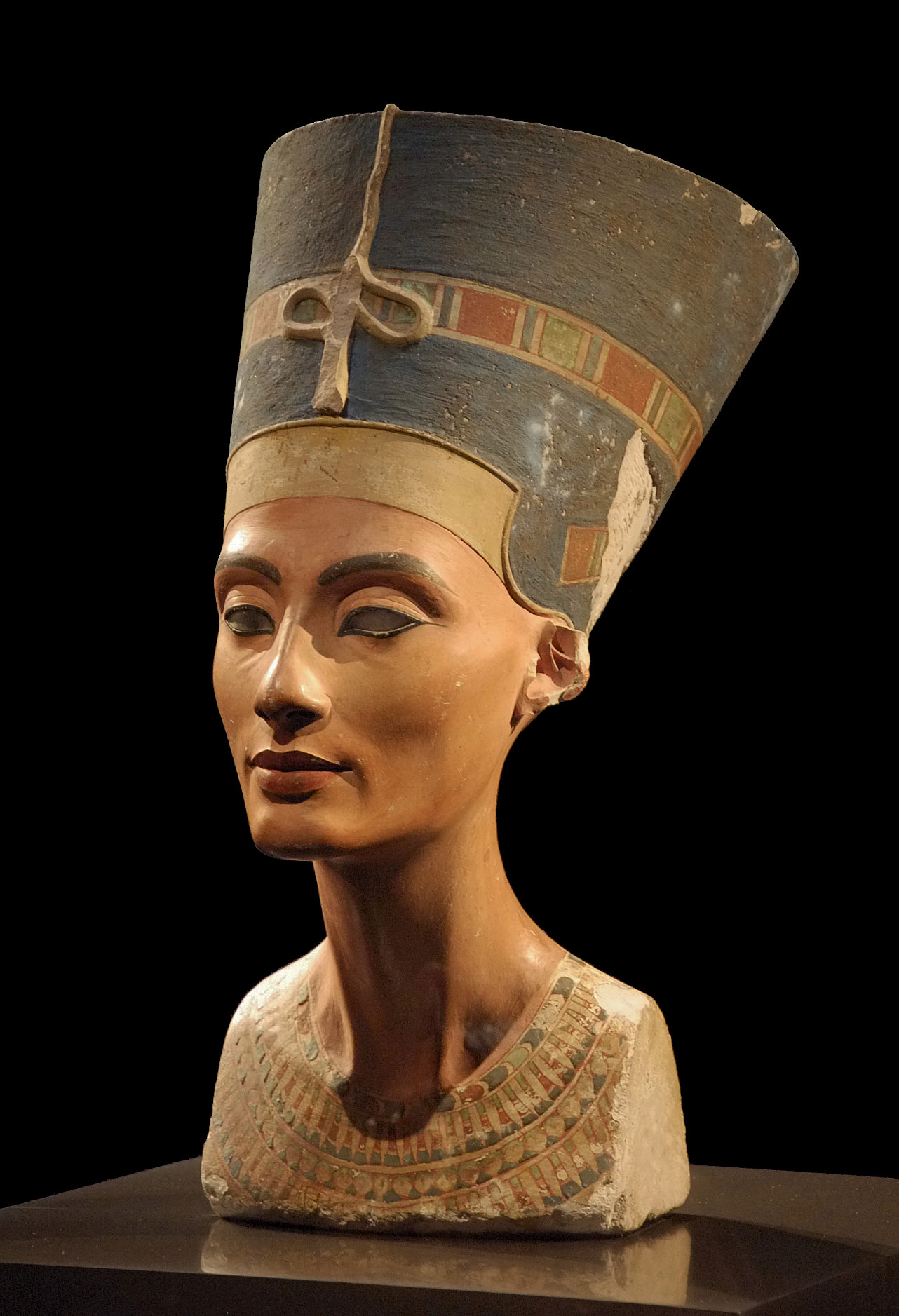
Nefertiti Bust; 1352–1336 BC; painted limestone; height: 50 cm; Neues Museum (Berlin, Germany)

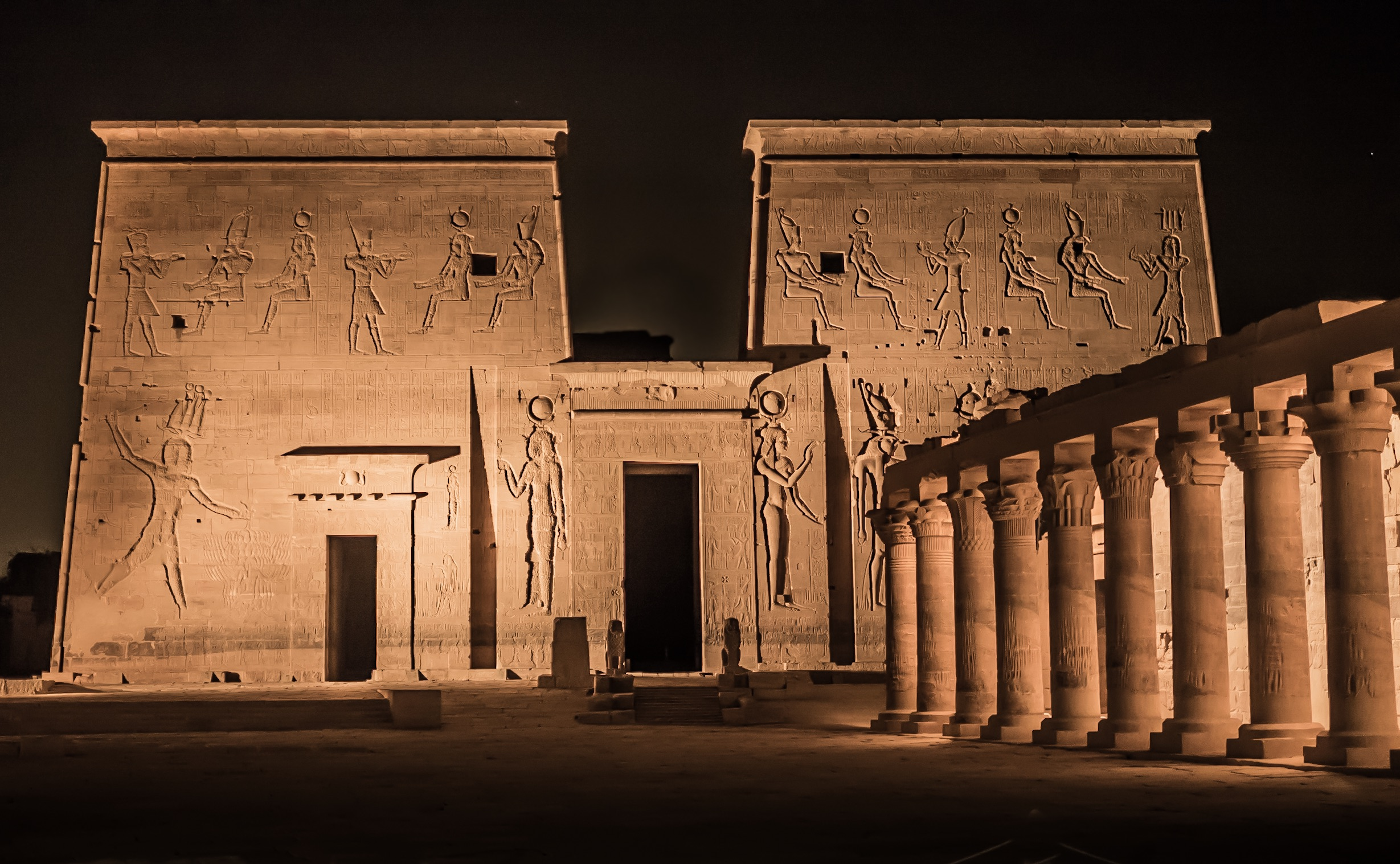
Temple of Philae (Egypt), 380 BC-117 AD

=== Indus Valley Civilization ===
Discovered in 1922, long after the contemporary cultures of Mesopotamia and Egypt, the Indus Valley Civilization, aka the Harappan Civilization (c. 2400–1900 BC) is now recognized as extraordinarily advanced, comparable in some ways with those cultures. Its sites span an area stretching from today's northeast Afghanistan, through much of Pakistan, and into western and northwestern India. Major cities of the culture include Harappa and Mohenjo-daro, located respectively in Punjab and in Sindh province in northern Pakistan, and the port city Lothal, in the state of Gujarat (India). The most numerous artefacts are square and rectangular stamp seals and seal impressions, featuring animals, usually bulls, very short Harappan texts. Many stylized terracotta figurines have also been found in Harappan sites, and a few stone and bronze sculptures, more naturalistic than the ceramic ones.

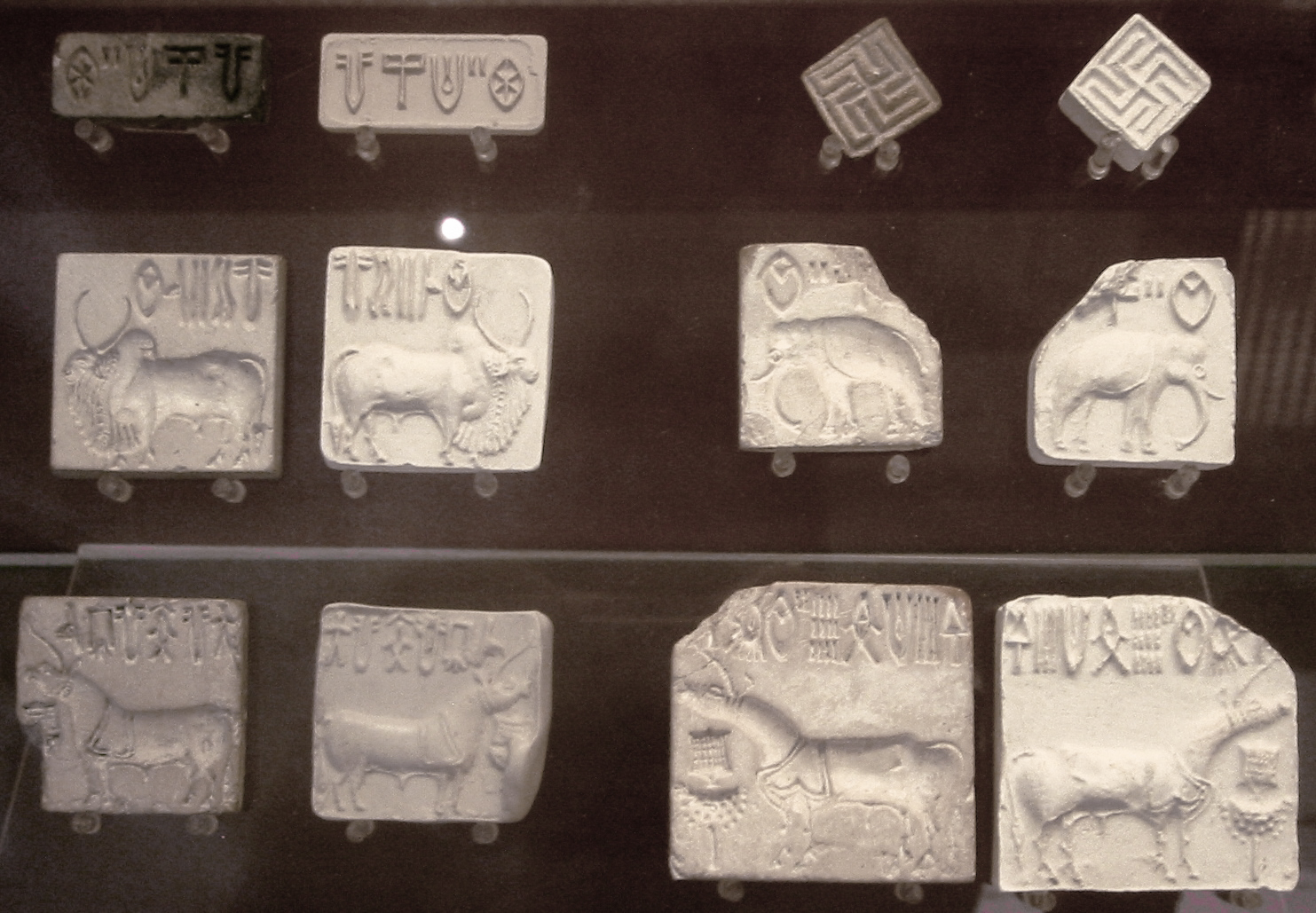
Seals with Indus script and impressions; 2500-2000 BC; steatite; various sizes, mostly c.3 cm; British Museum (London)

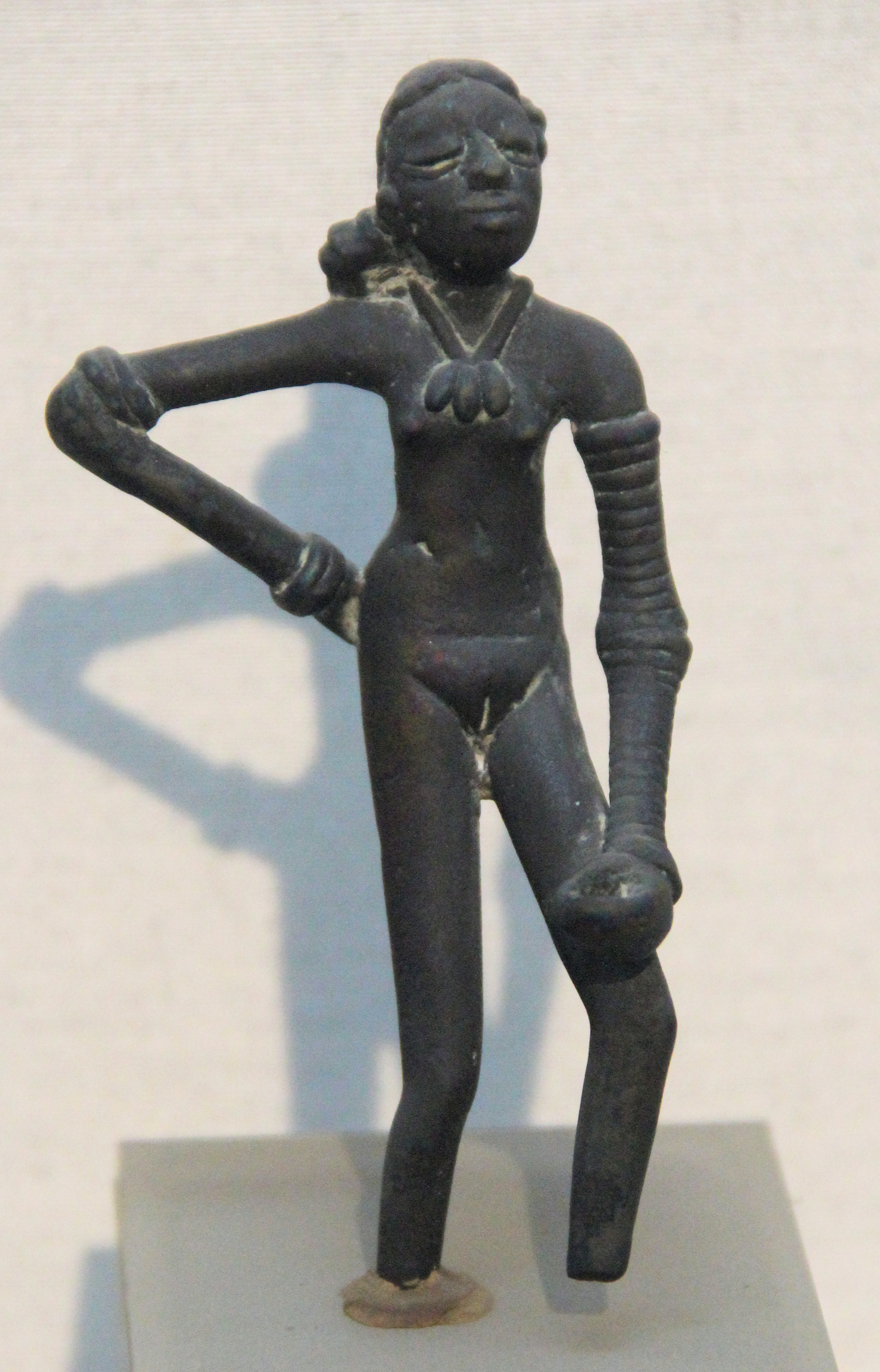
Dancing Girl; c. 2400–1900 BC; bronze; height: 10.8 cm; National Museum (New Delhi, India)

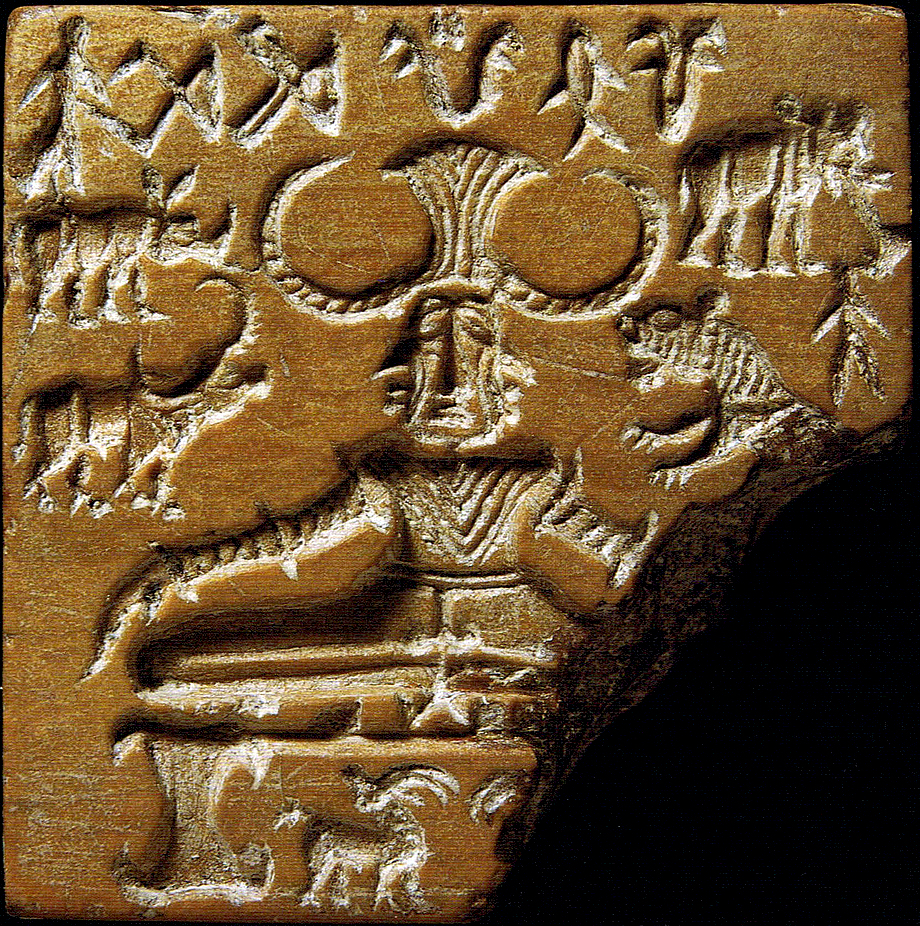
Proto-Shiva Stamp Seal; c. 2400–1900 BC; steatite; height: 3.6 cm; National Museum (New Delhi)

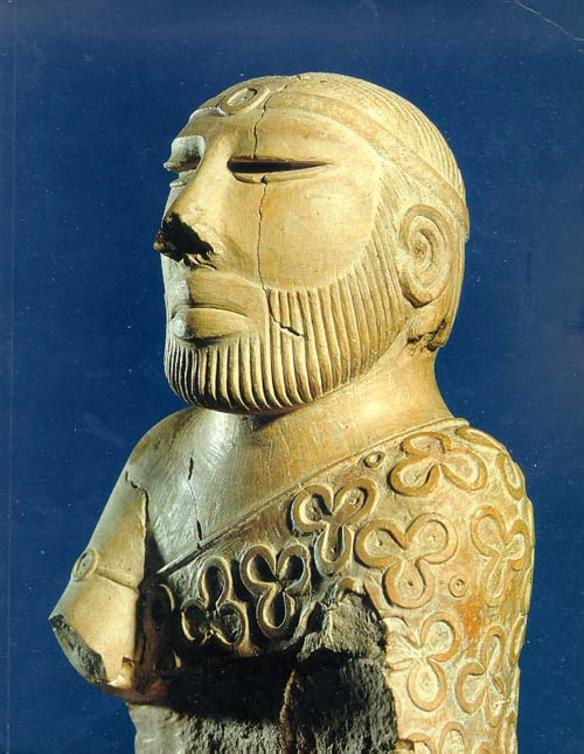
Priest-King; c. 2400–1900 BC; steatite; height: 17.5 cm; National Museum of Pakistan (Karachi)

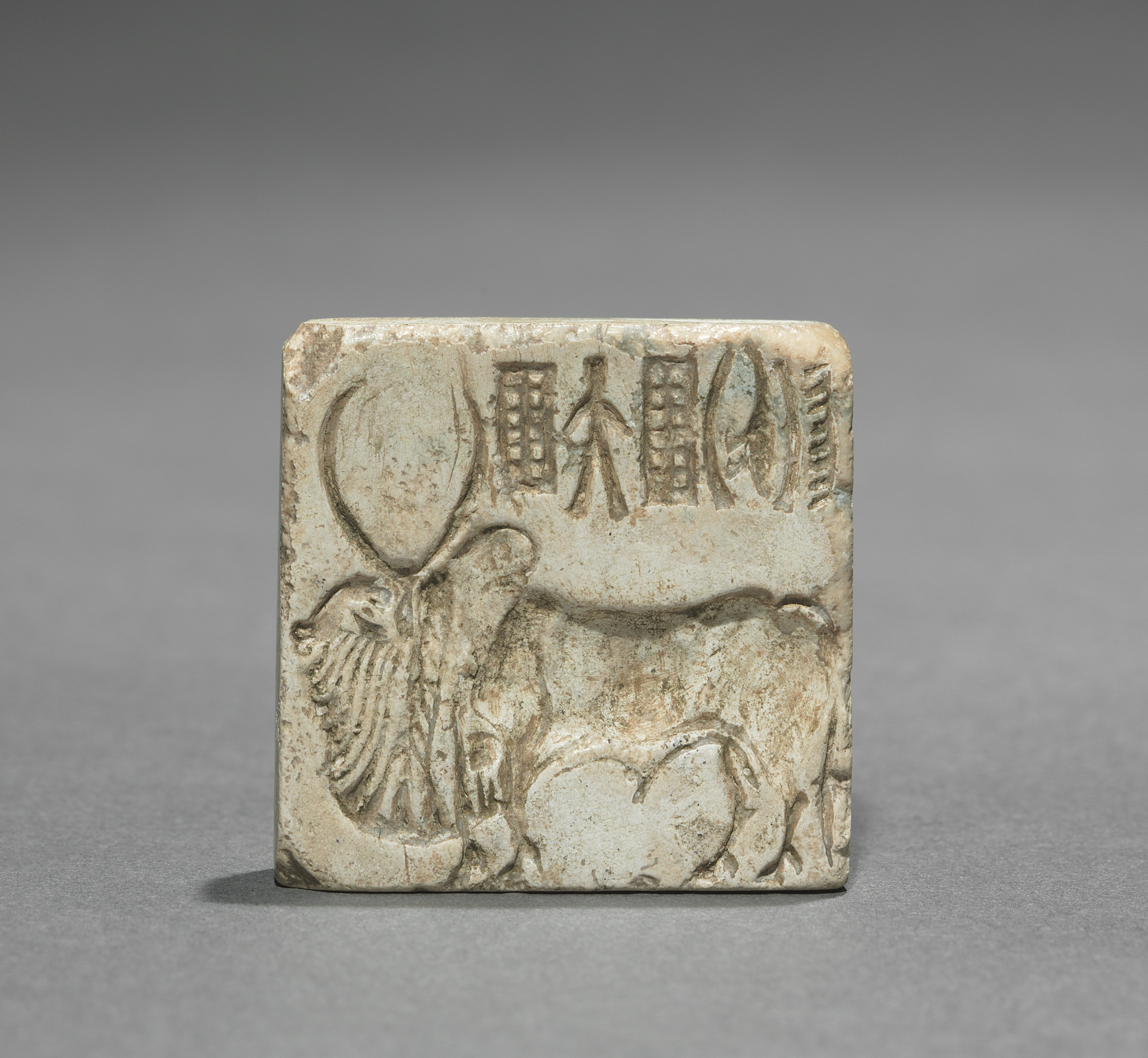
Seal with two-horned bull and inscription; c. 2010 BC; steatite; overall: 3.2 × 3.2 cm; Cleveland Museum of Art (Cleveland, Ohio, US)

=== China ===
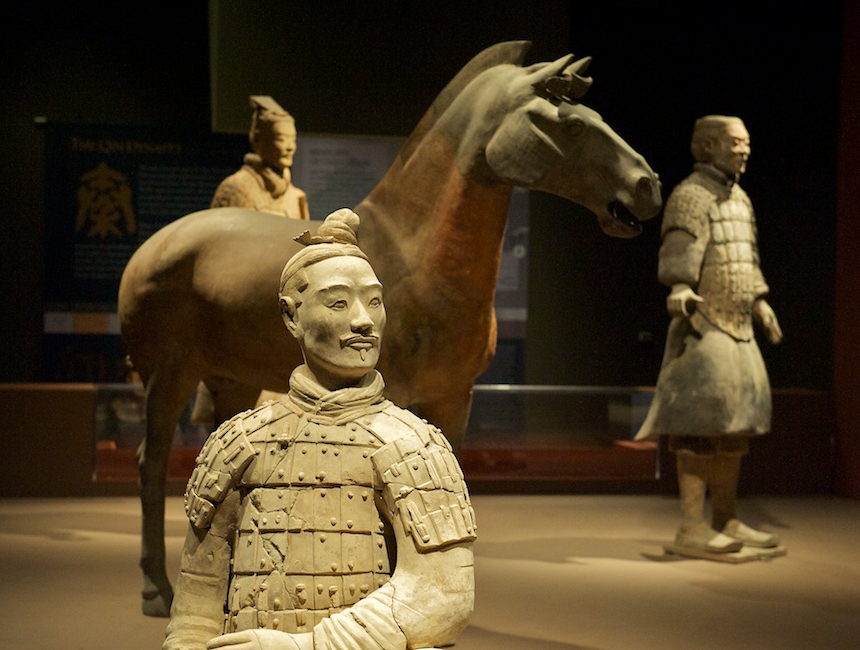
Warriors of the Terracotta Army; c. 214 BC; terracotta; height (average soldier): c. 1.8 m; Lintong District (Xi'an, Shaanxi, China)

The first metal objects produced in China were made almost 4000 years ago, during the Xia dynasty (c. 2100–1700 BC). During the Chinese Bronze Age (the Shang and Zhou dynasties) court intercessions and communication with the spirit world were conducted by a shaman (possibly the king himself). In the Shang dynasty (c.1600–1050 BC), the supreme deity was Shangdi, but aristocratic families preferred to contact the spirits of their ancestors. They prepared elaborate banquets of food and drink for them, heated and served in bronze ritual vessels. These bronze vessels had many shapes, depending on their purpose: for wine, water, cereals or meat, and some of them were marked with readable characters, which shows the development of writing. This kind of vessels, of a very high quality and complexity, were discovered on the Valley of the Yellow River in the Henan province, in sites like Erlitou, Anyang or Zhengzhou. They were used in religious rituals to cement the Shang authority, and when the Shang capital fell, around 1050 BC, its conquerors, the Zhou (c.1050–156 BC), continued to use these containers in religious rituals, but principally for food rather than drink. The Shang court had been accused of excessive drunkenness, and the Zhou, promoting the imperial Tian ("Heaven") as the prime spiritual force, rather than ancestors, limited wine in religious rites, in favour of food. The use of ritual bronzes continued into the early Han dynasty (206 BC–220 AD).

One of the most commonly used motifs was the taotie, a stylized face divided centrally into two almost mirror-image halves, with nostrils, eyes, eyebrows, jaws, cheeks and horns, surrounded by incised patterns. Whether taotie represented real, mythological or wholly imaginary creatures cannot be determined.

The enigmatic bronzes of Sanxingdui, near Guanghan (in Sichuan province), are evidence for a mysterious sacrificial religious system unlike anything elsewhere in ancient China and quite different from the art of the contemporaneous Shang at Anyang. Excavations at Sanxingdui since 1986 have revealed four pits containing artefacts of bronze, jade and gold. There was found a great bronze statue of a human figure which stands on a plinth decorated with abstract elephant heads. Besides the standing figure, the first two pits contained over 50 bronze heads, some wearing headgear and three with a frontal covering of gold leaf. Tubular bronze fragments with little branches were discovered here as well, probably representing trees, and also bronze leaves, fruits and birds. Over 4000 objects were found at Sanxingdui in 1986.

Succeeding the Shang dynasty the Zhou dynasty (1050–221 BC) ruled more than any other one from Chinese history. Its last centuries were characterized by violence, the era being known as the Warring States period. During this troubling time, some philosophical movements appeared: Confucianism, Daoism and Legalism.

The Warring States period was ended by Qinshi Huangdi, who united China in 221 BC. He ordered a huge tomb, guarded by the Terracotta Army. Another huge project was a predecessor of the Great Wall, erected for rejecting pillaging tribes from the north. After the death of the emperor, his dynasty, the Qin (221–206 BC), lasted only three years. Qinshi Huangdi was followed by the Han dynasty (202 BC – 220 AD), during which the Silk Road developed considerably, bringing new cultural influences in China.

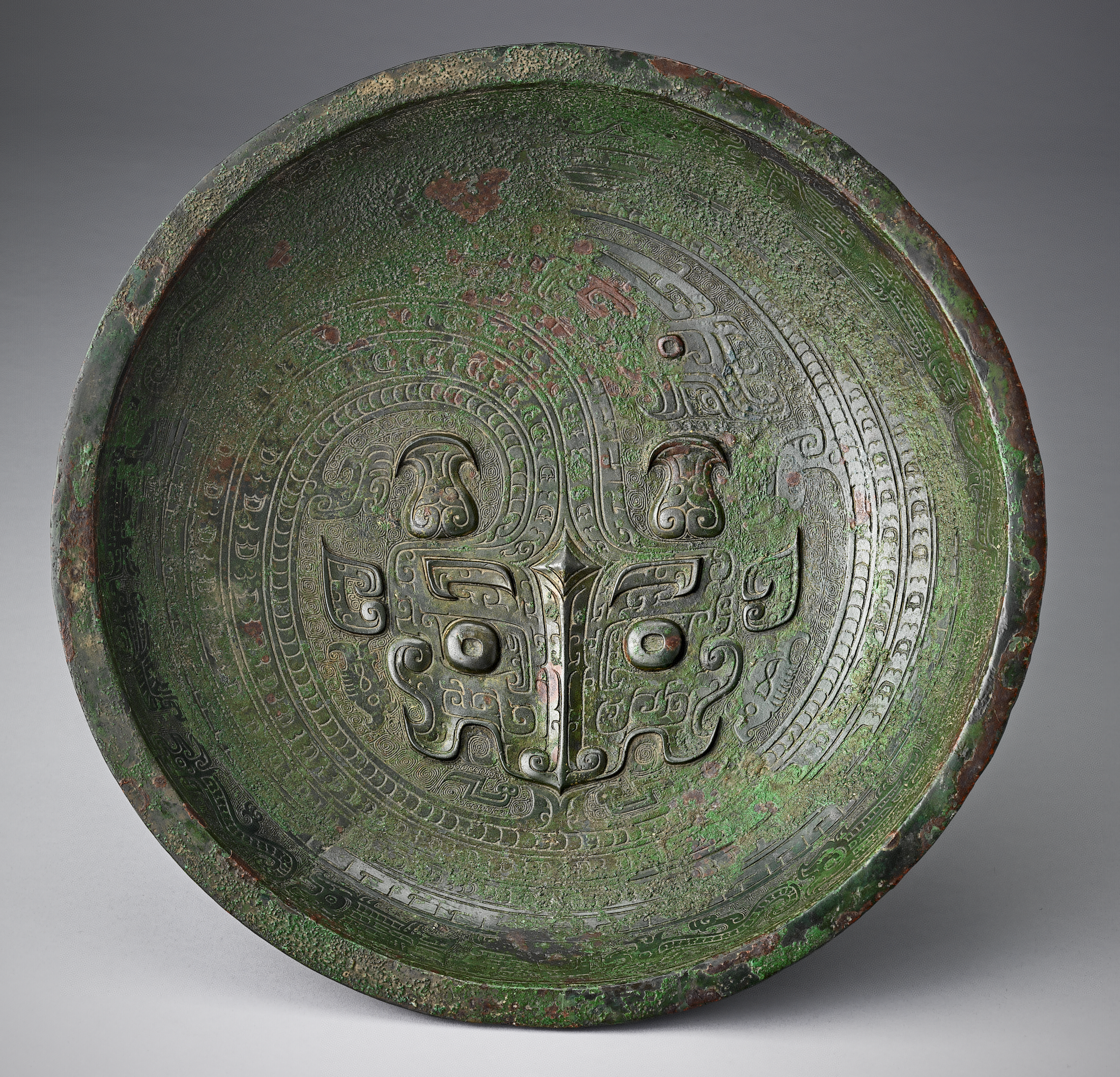
Bronze water vessel with coiling dragon pattern, late Shang dynasty (c. 14th – mid-11th century BC)

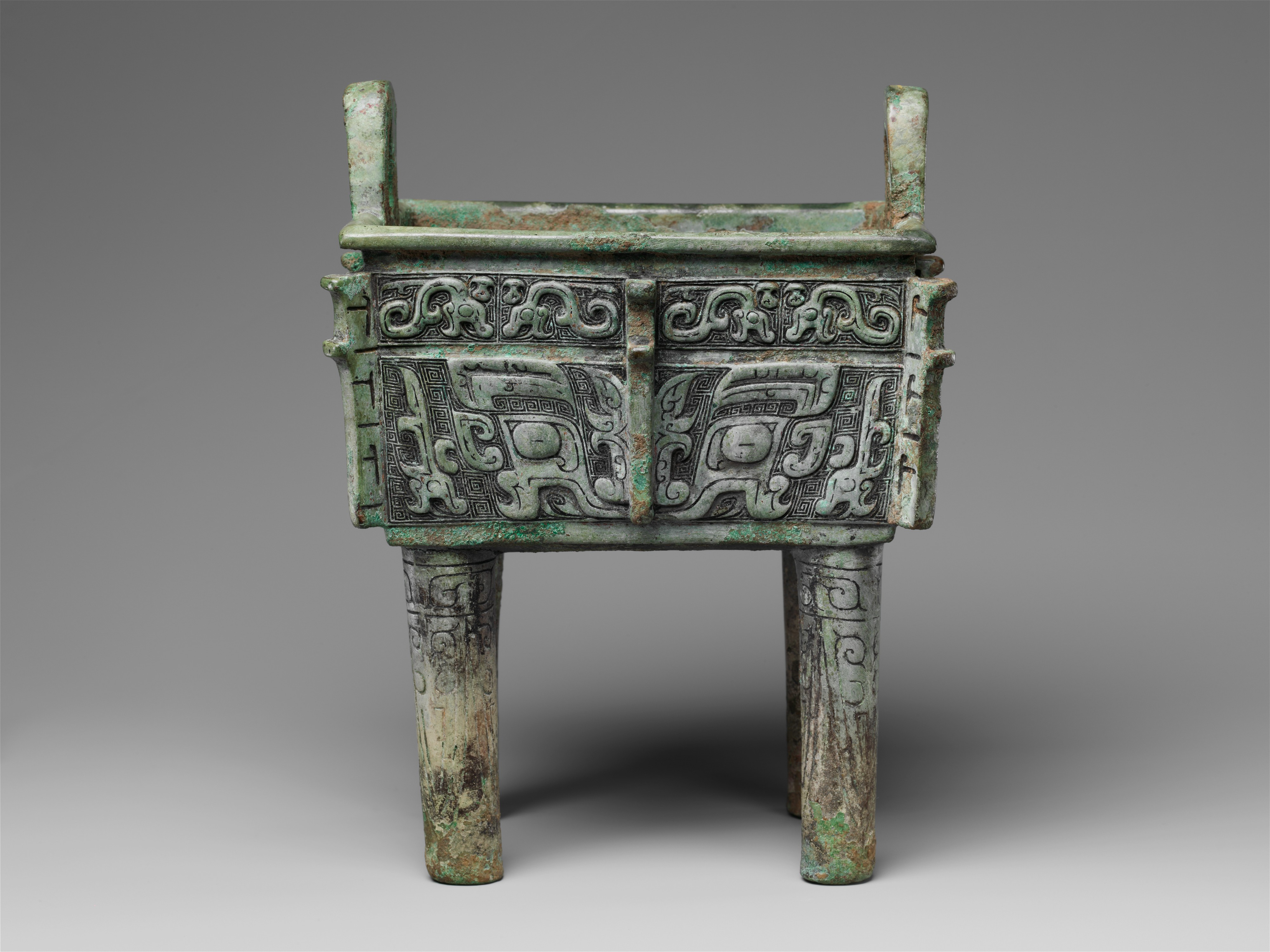
Rectangular cauldron; 12th–11th century BCE; bronze; Metropolitan Museum of Art (New York City)

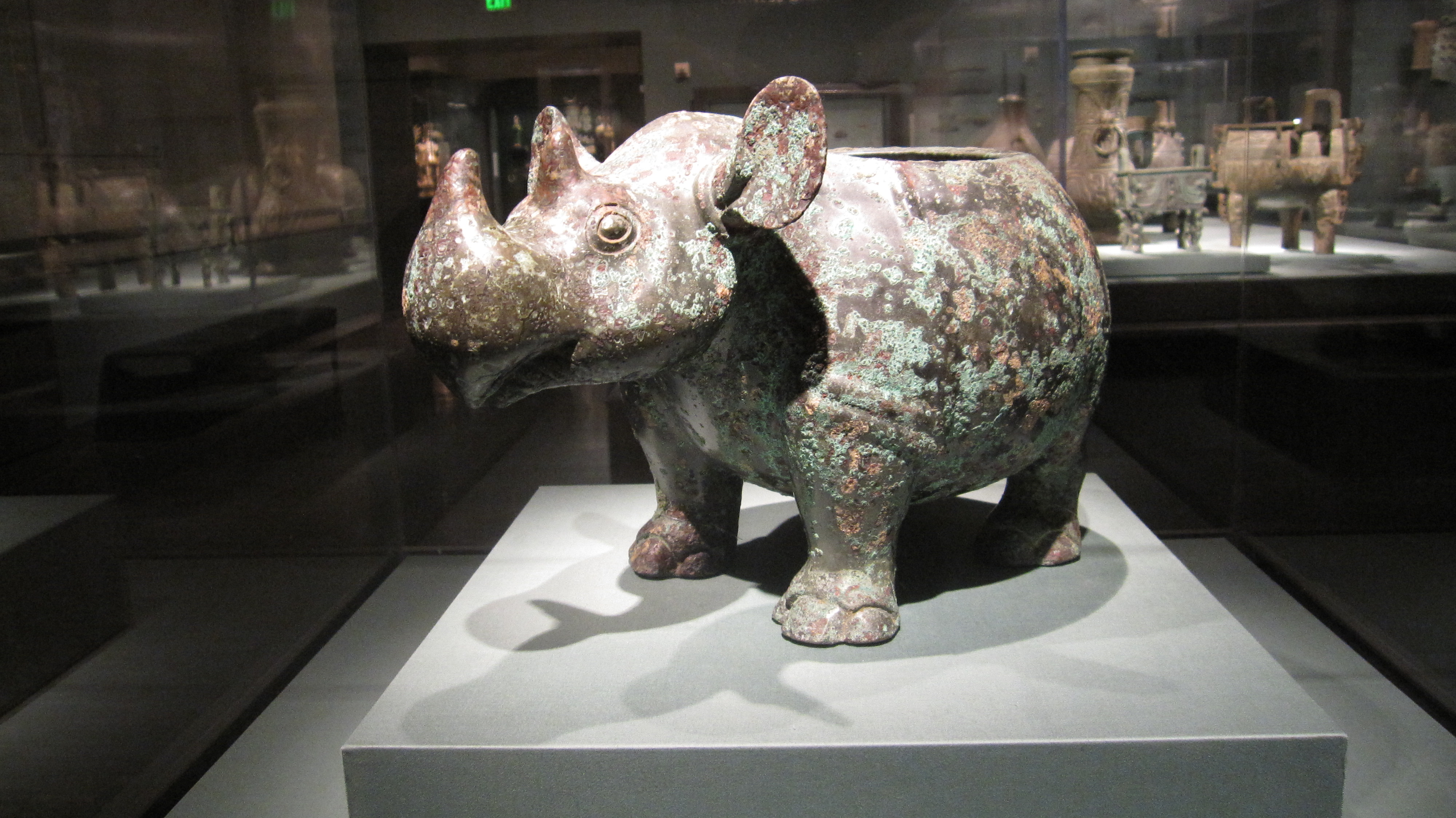
Bronze rhinoceros-shaped wine vessel, 11th century BCE

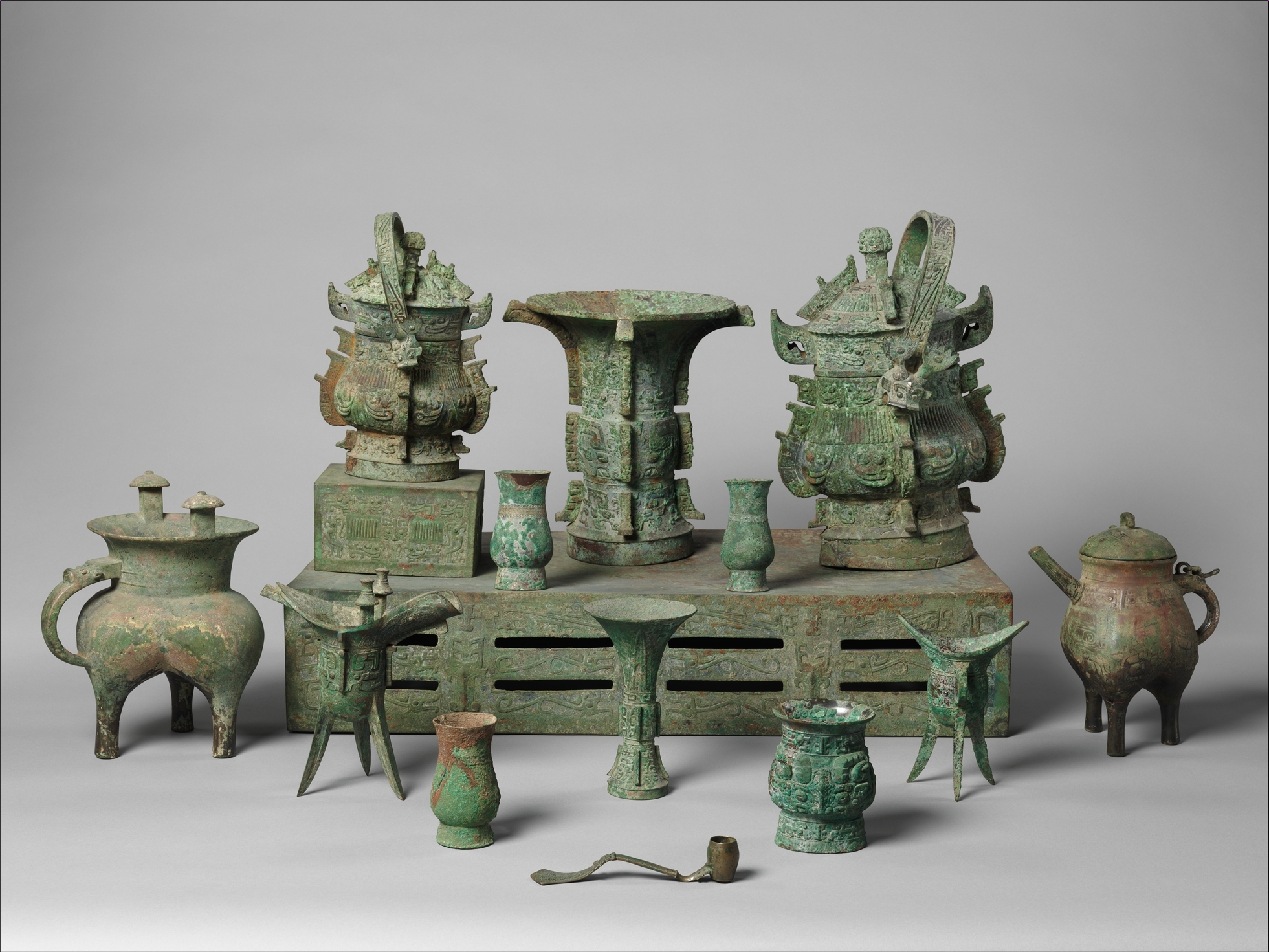
Altar set; late 11th century BCE; bronze; Metropolitan Museum of Art

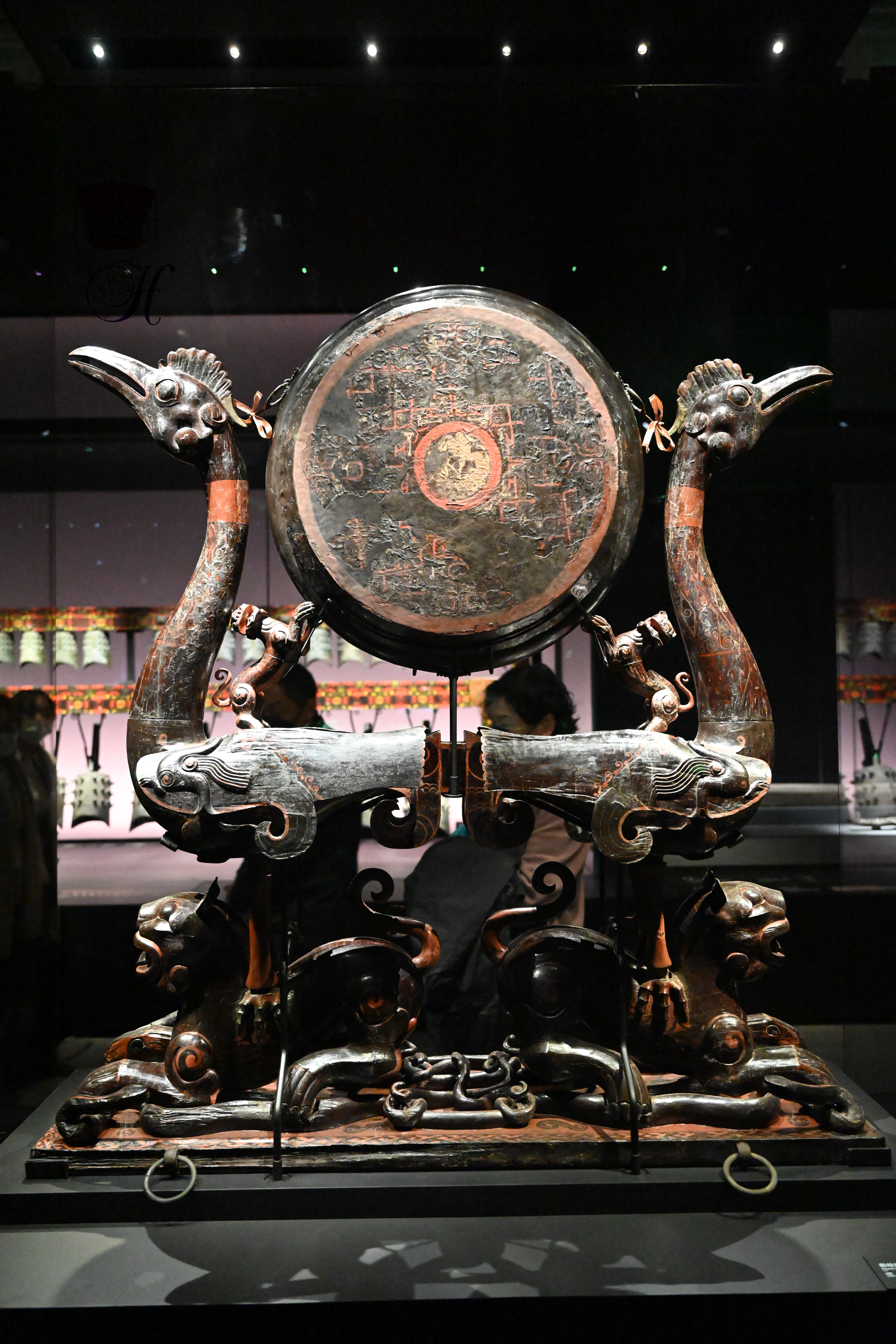
Drum with and Bird and Tiger Frame, Chu (state) Lacquerware, 8th century BC

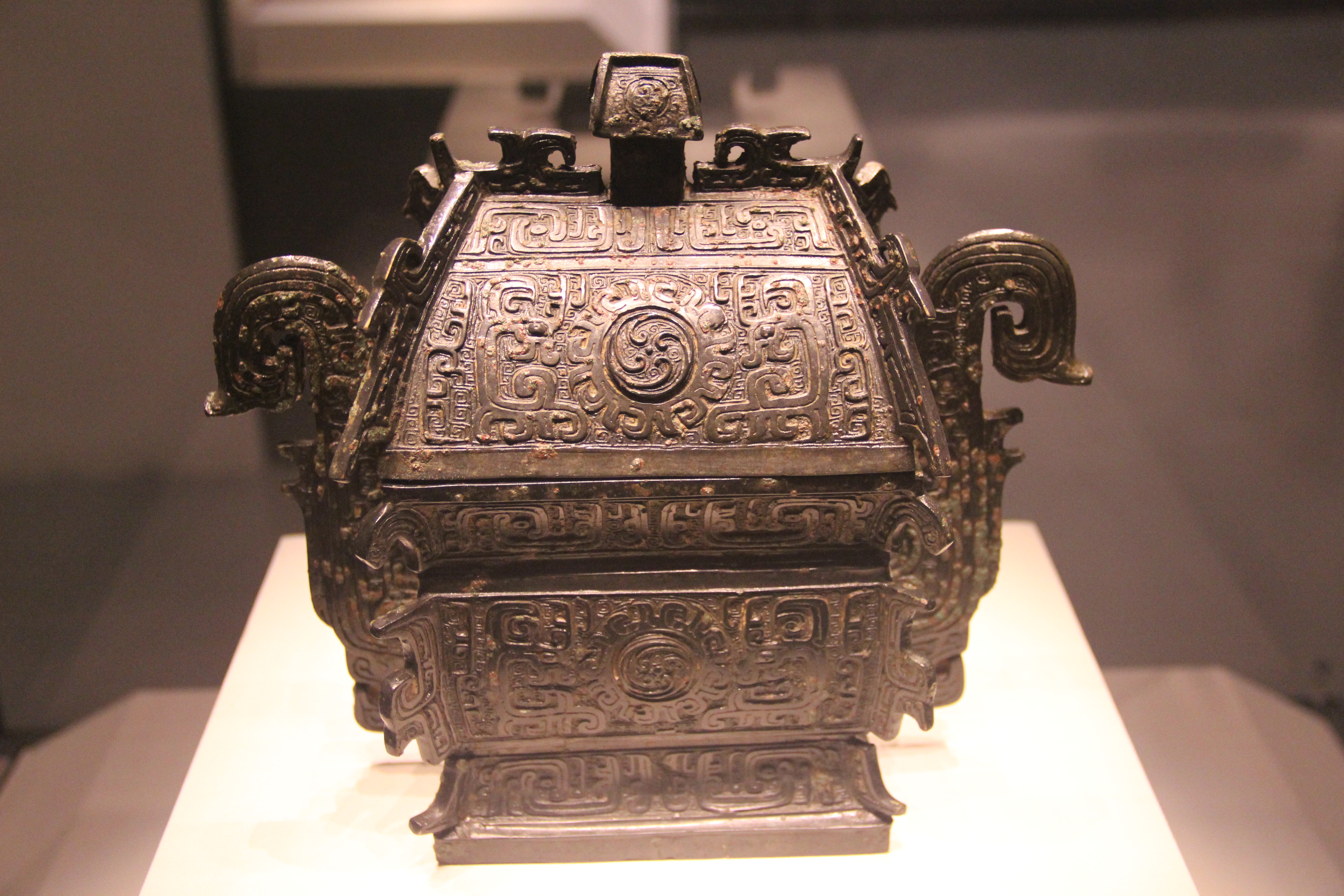
Fang Lei; c. 925–875 BC; bronze; height: 22.8 cm; National Museum of China (Beijing, China)

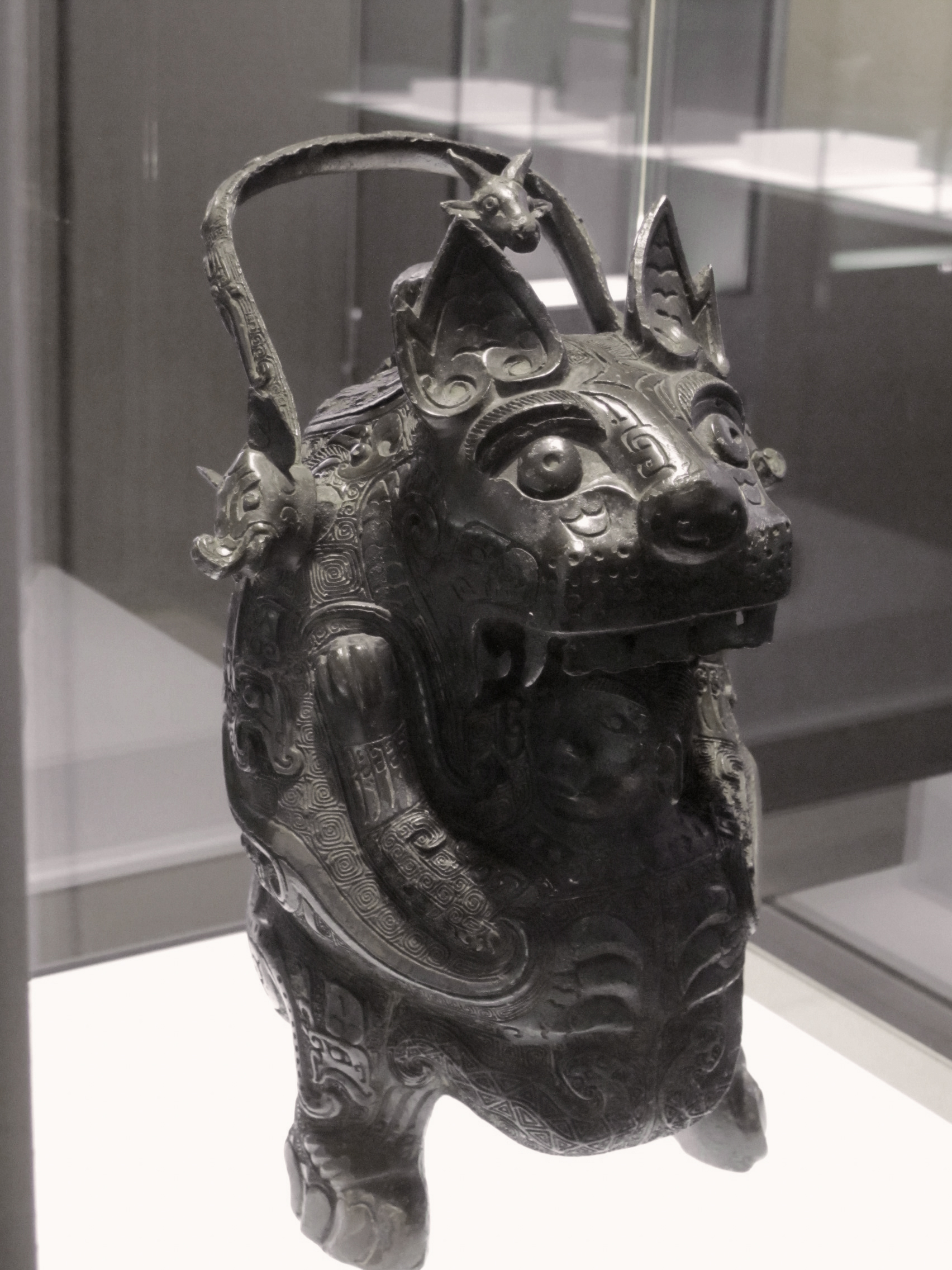
A Shang dynasty vessel made of bronze, used to preserve drink; 2nd millennium BC

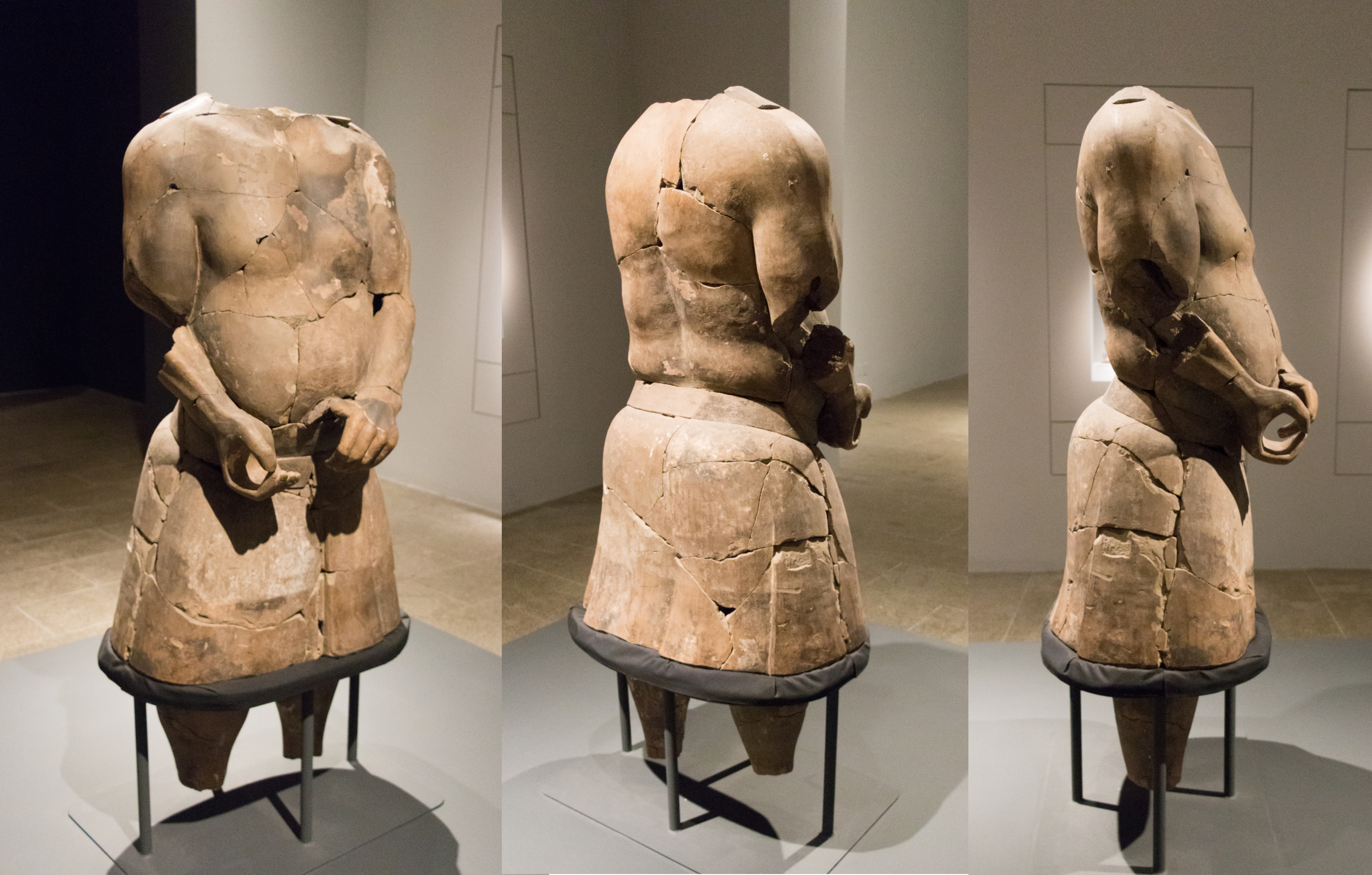
"Strongman", from The Acrobats series. Mausoleum of the First Qin Emperor, 210 BCE.

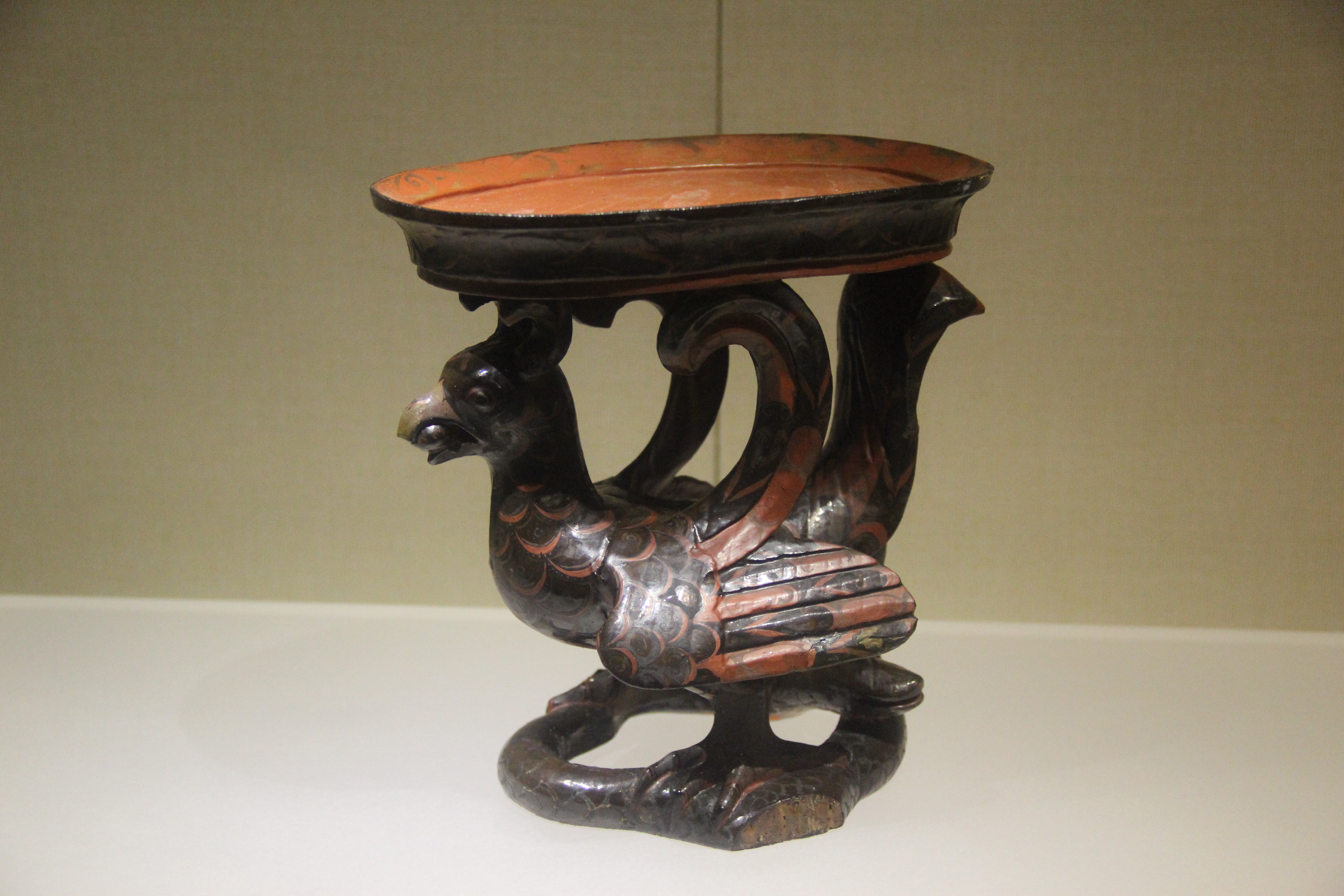
Lacquer phoenix dou, State of Chu c. 5th Century BCE

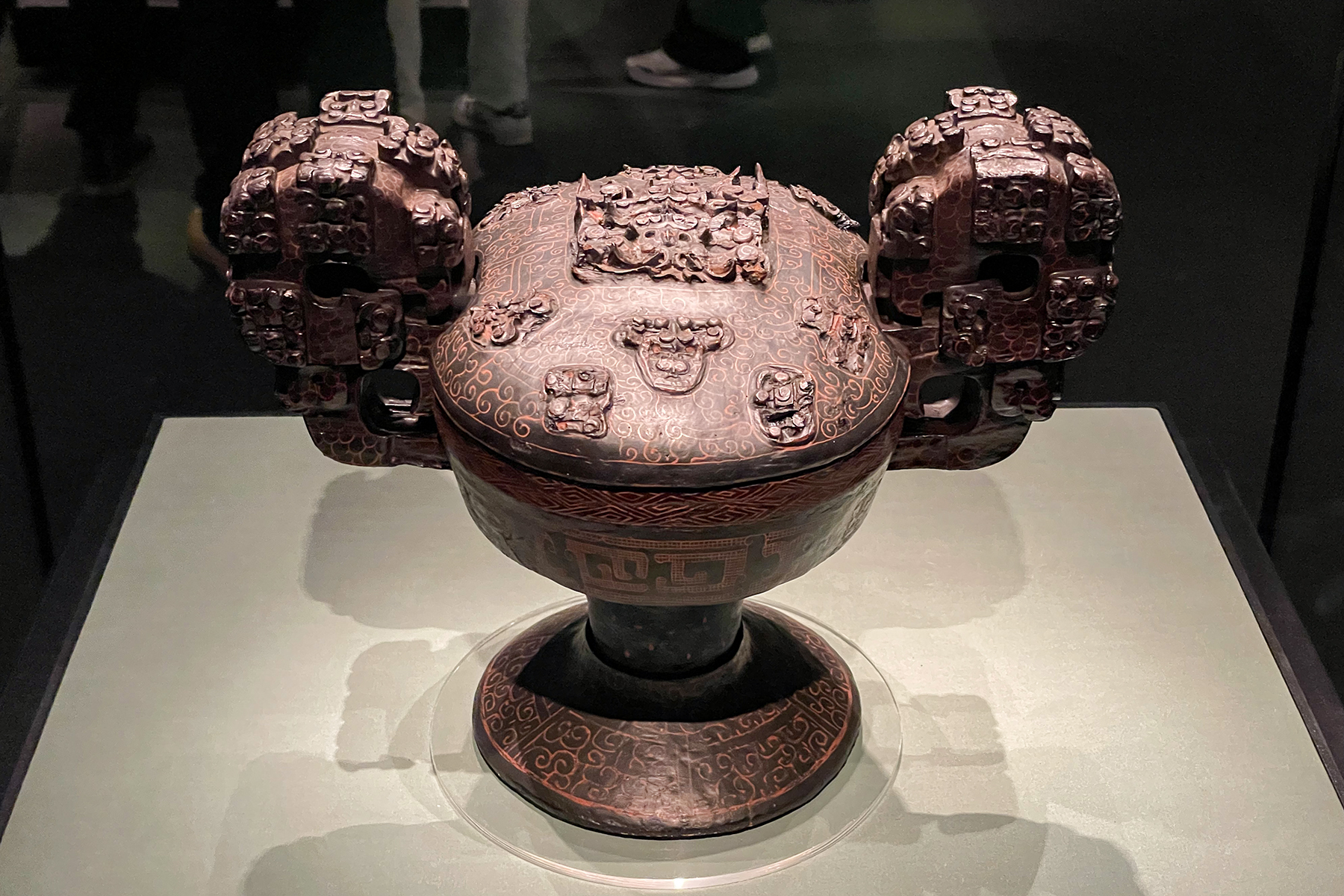
Lacquer dou-vessel from the Tomb of Marquis Yi of Zeng c. 433 BCE

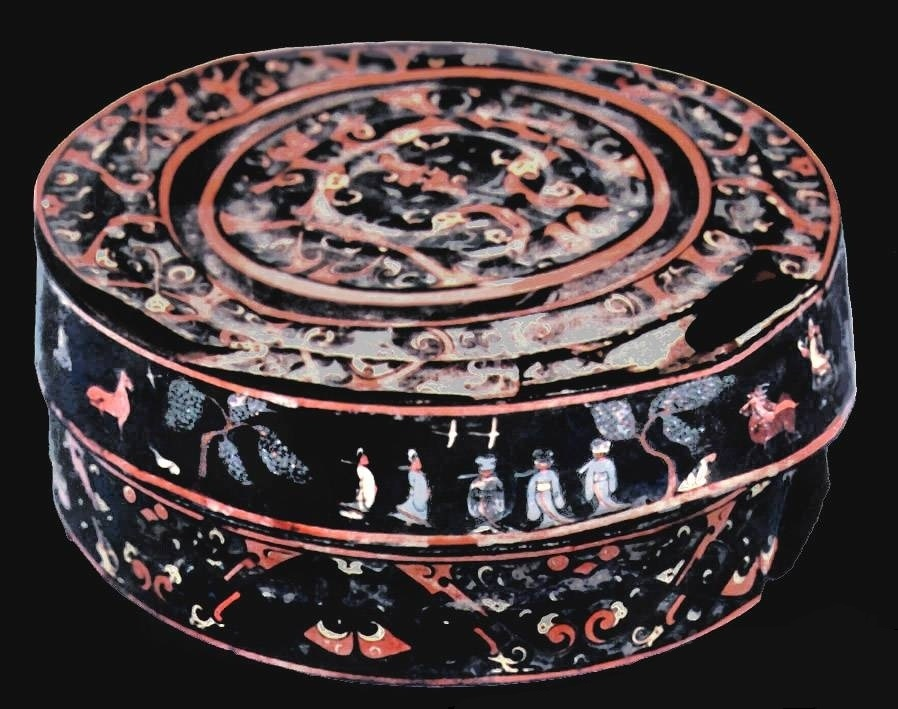
Lacquerware box from the Jingmen Tomb (荊門楚墓; Jīngmén chǔ mù) of the State of Chu (704–223 BC)

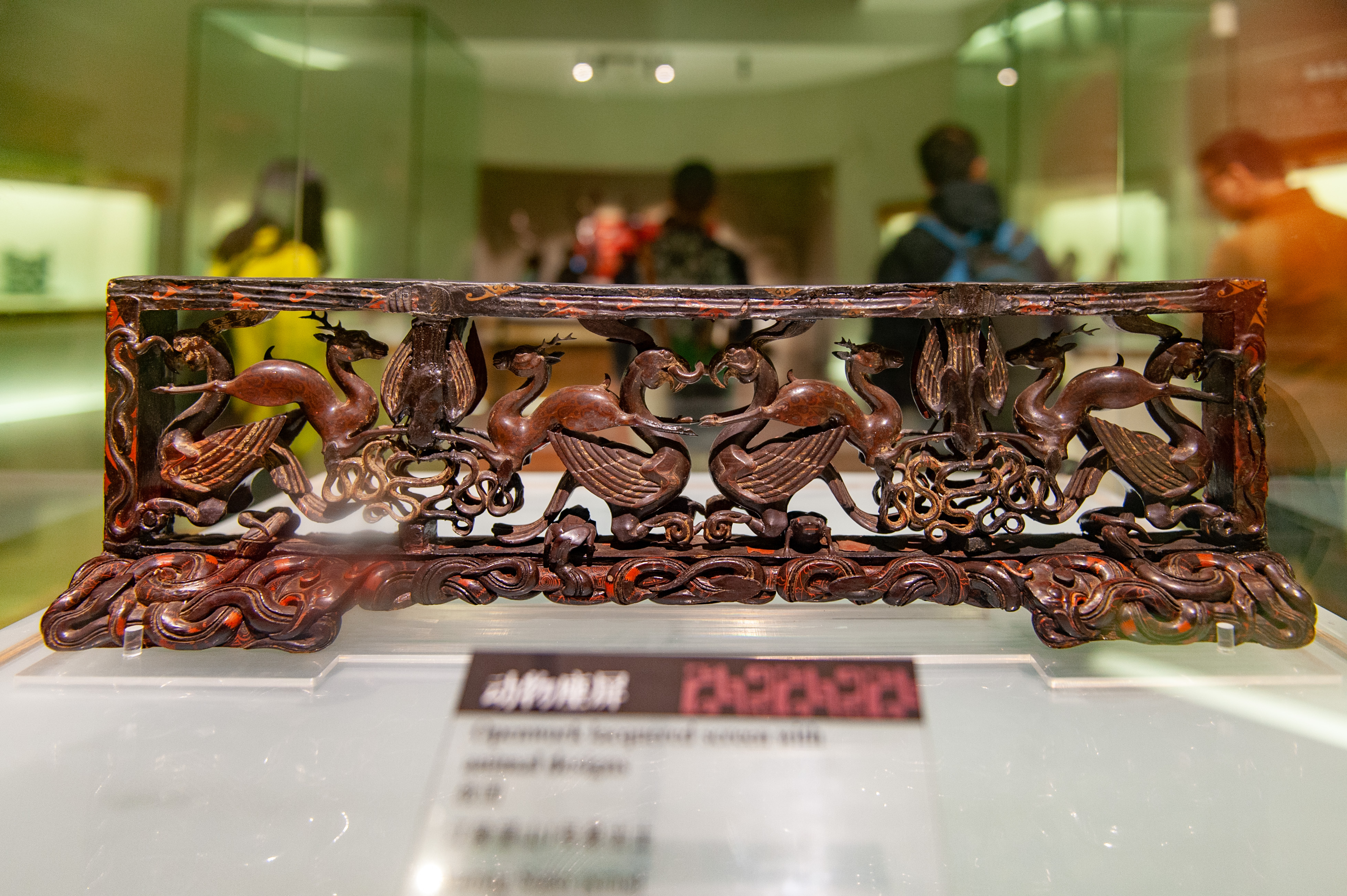
Openwork lacquered screen with animal designs, Warring States period (c. 4th century BCE)

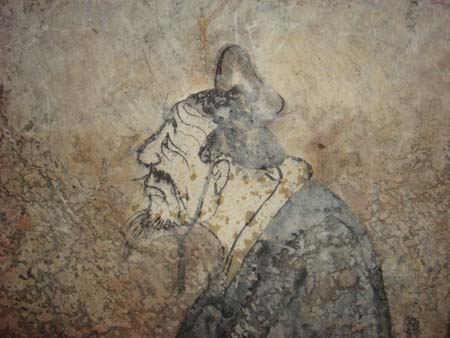
Western Han tomb fresco depicting the philosopher Confucius; c. 1st century BCE; from Dongping County, Shandong

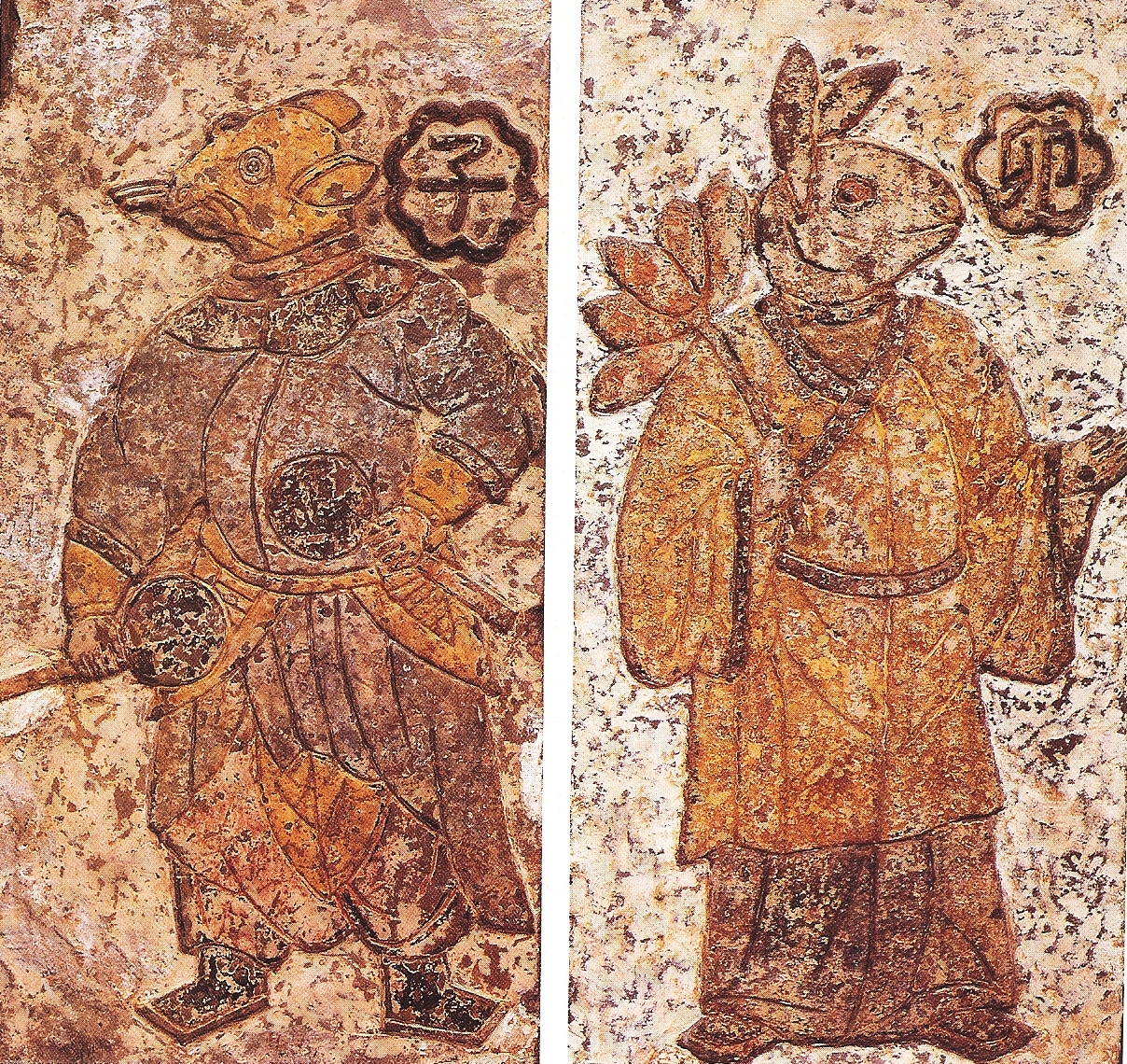
Animalistic guardian spirits of midnight and morning wearing Chinese robes, Han dynasty (202 BCE – 220 CE) on ceramic tile

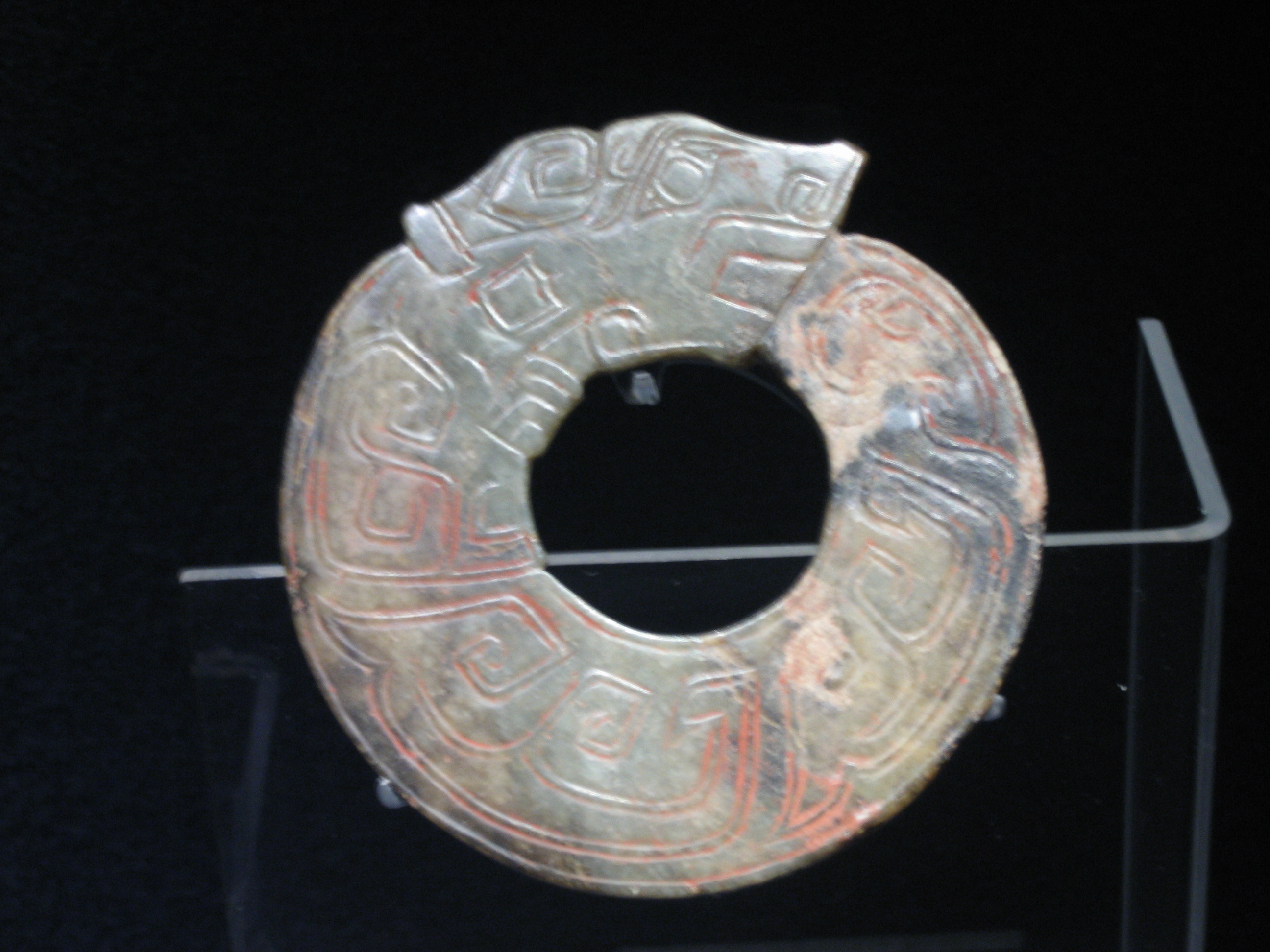
Two-dragon ring, early Shang dynasty (2nd millennium BCE)

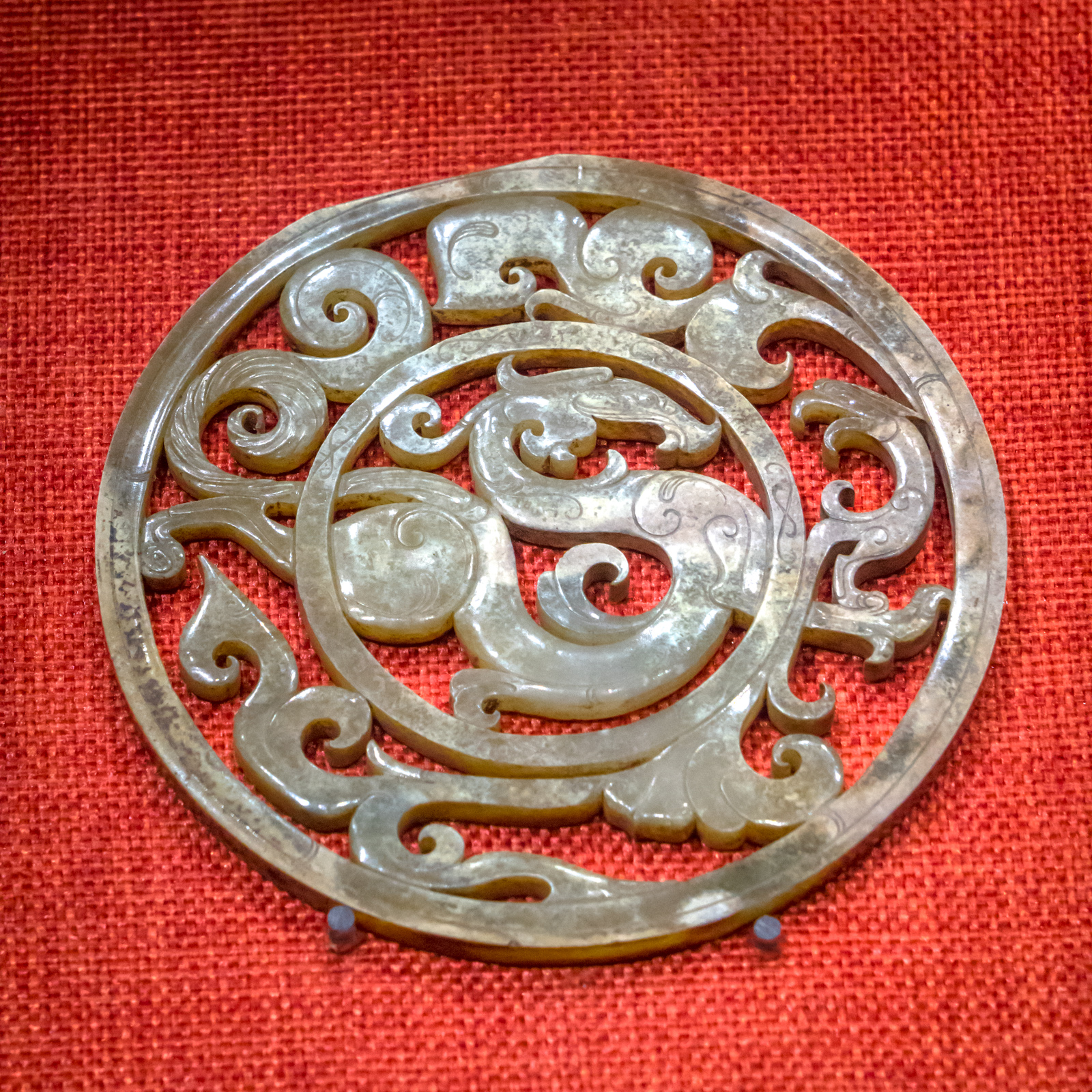
Jade Openwork Disk, Nanyue (c. 2nd century BCE)

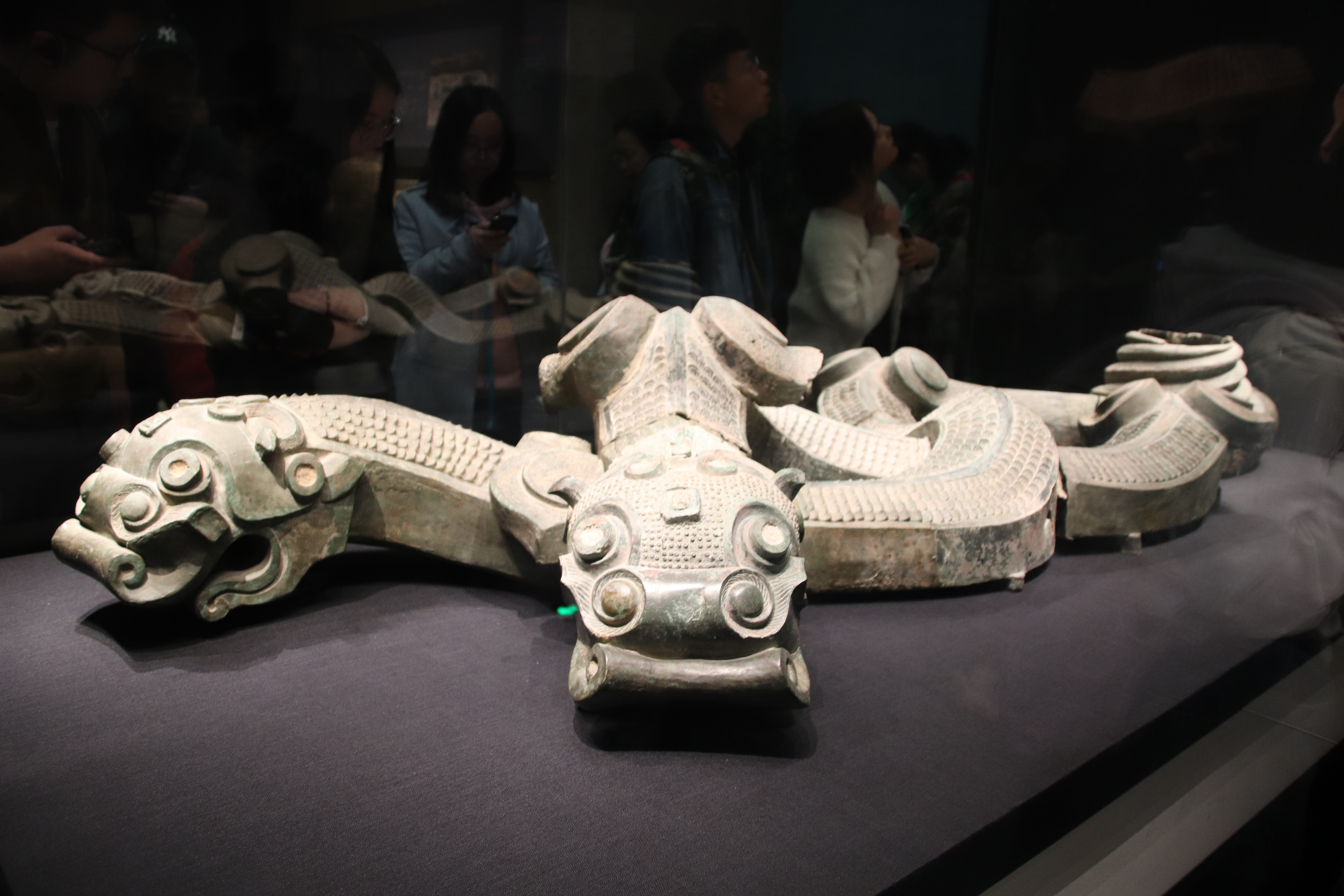
Qin dynasty twin bronze dragons, found near the Mausoleum of the First Qin Emperor.

=== Greek ===
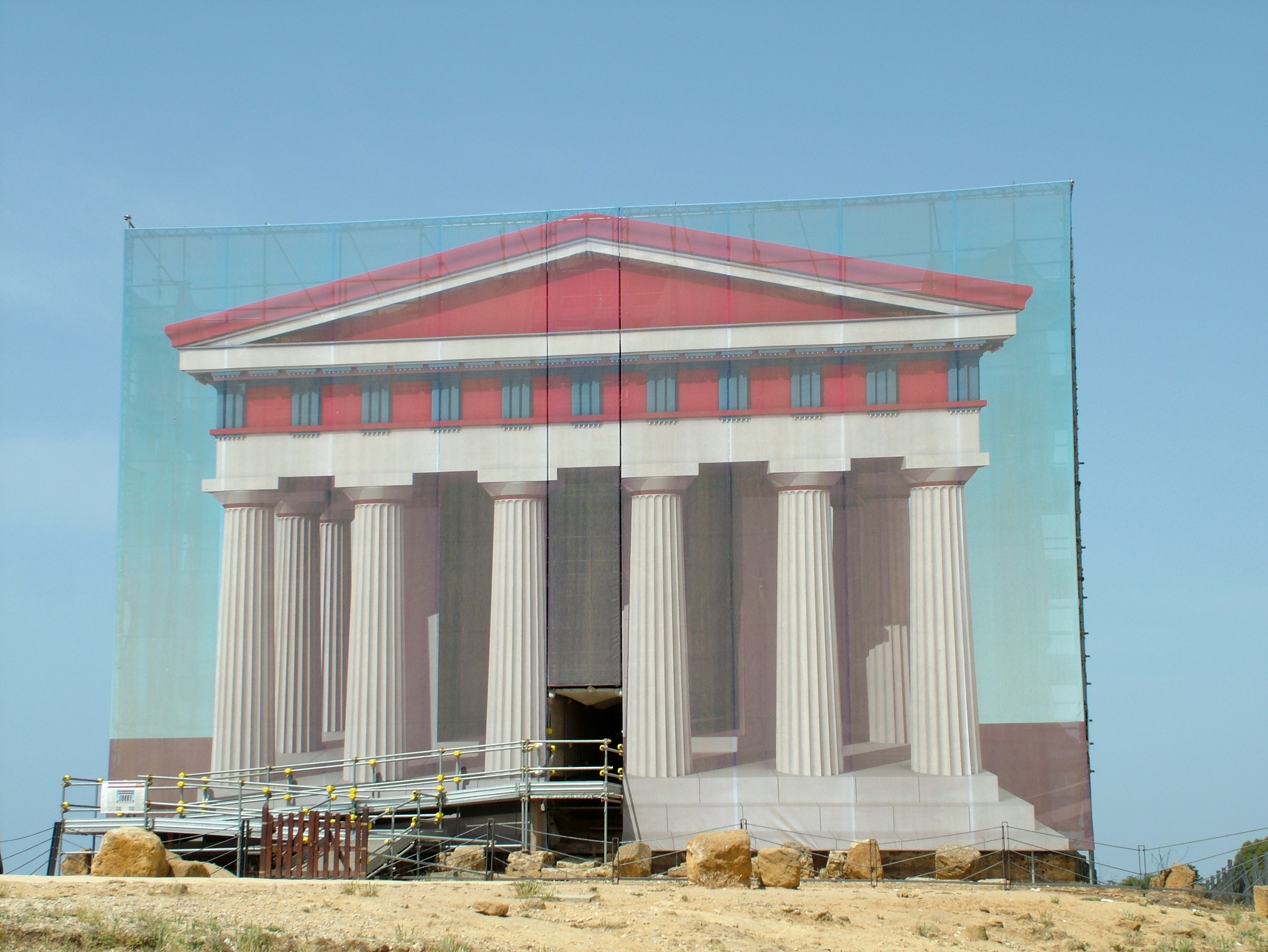
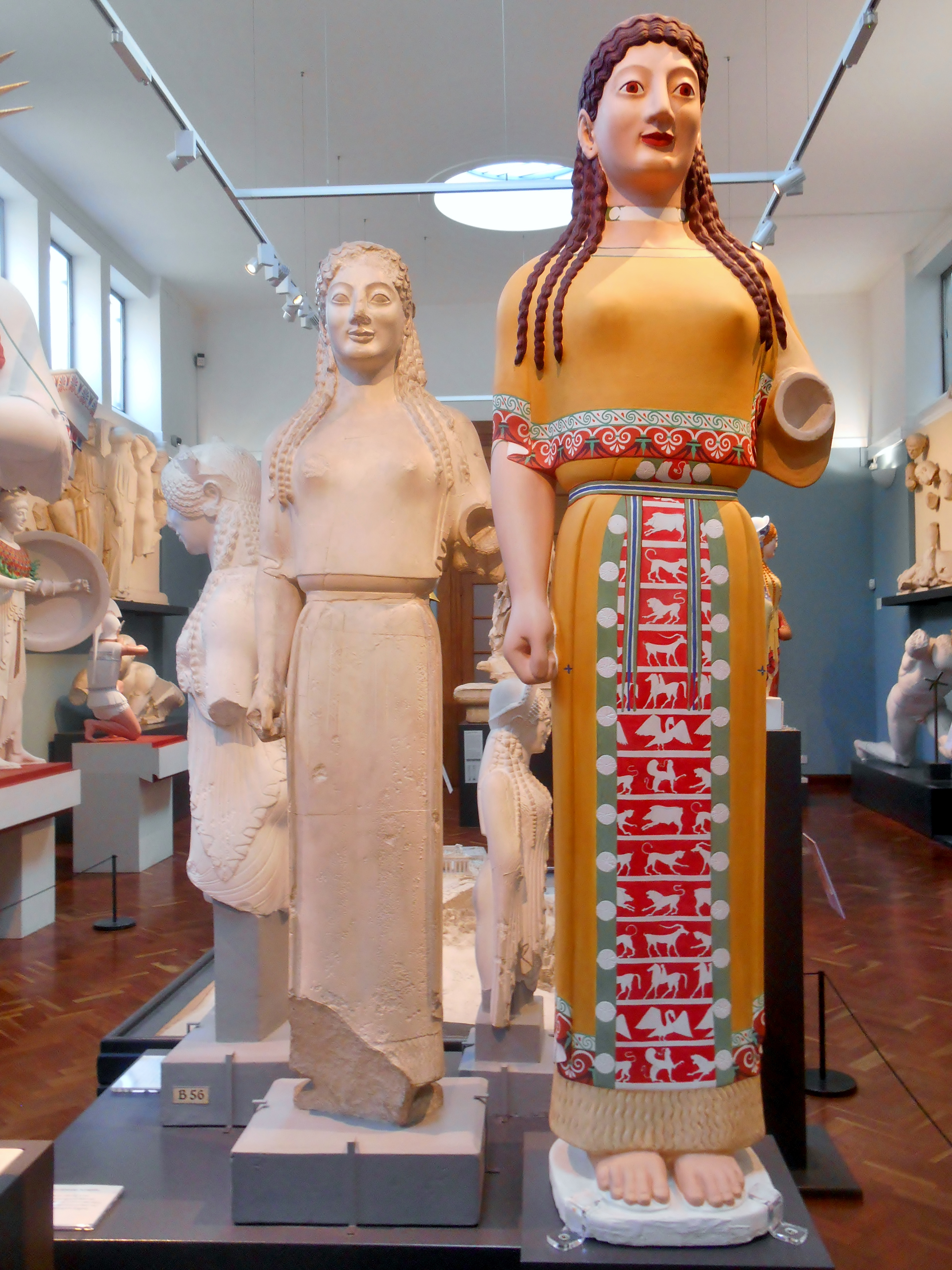
Unlike how most of us see them today, all Egyptian, Greek and Roman sculptures and temples were initially painted in bright colours. They became white because of hundreds of years of neglect and vandalism provoked by Christians during the Early Middle Ages, who saw them as 'pagan' and believed that they promoted idolatry.

Through harmonious proportion and a focus on aesthetics, ancient Greek and Roman art became the foundation and inspiration of all Western art, being the standard to which most European artists aspired, until the 19th century. The Latin poet Horace, writing in the age of Roman emperor Augustus (1st century BC to 1st century AD), famously remarked that although conquered on the battlefield, "captive Greece overcame its savage conqueror and brought the arts to rustic Rome." The power of Greek art lies in its representation of the human figure and its focus on human beings and the anthropomorphic gods as chief subjects. The artworks of the Greeks were meant to decorate temples and public buildings, to celebrate battle victories and remarkable personalities, and to commemorate the dead. They were also given as offerings to the gods.

Although there was no definitive transition, the art is usually divided stylistically into the four periods of Geometric, Archaic, Classical and Hellenistic. During the Classical period (5th and 4th centuries BC), realism and idealism were delicately balanced. In comparison, the works of the earlier Geometric (9th to 8th centuries BC) and Archaic (7th to 6th centuries BC) ages can seem appear primitive, but these artists had different goals: naturalistic representation was not necessarily their aim. Greek artists built on the artistic foundations of Egypt, further developing the arts of sculpture, painting, architecture, and ceramics. Among the techniques they perfected include methods of carving and casting sculptures, fresco painting and building magnificent buildings.

Roman art lovers collected ancient Greek originals, Roman replicas of Greek art, or newly created paintings and sculptures fashioned in a variety of Greek styles, thus preserving for posterity works of art otherwise lost. Wall and panel paintings, sculptures and mosaics decorated public spaces and private homes. Greek imagery also appeared on Roman jewellery, vessels of gold, silver, bronze and terracotta, and even on weapons and commercial weights. Rediscovered during the early Renaissance, the arts of ancient Greece, transmitted through the Roman Empire, have served as the foundation of Western art until the 19th century.

Since the advent of the Classical Age in Athens, in the 5th century BC, the Classical way of building has been deeply woven into Western understanding of architecture and, indeed, of civilization itself. From circa 850 BC to circa 300 AD, ancient Greek culture flourished on the Greek mainland, on the Peloponnese, and on the Aegean islands. Five of the Wonders of the World were Greek: the Temple of Artemis at Ephesus, the Statue of Zeus at Olympia, the Mausoleum at Halicarnassus, the Colossus of Rhodes, and the Lighthouse of Alexandria. However, Ancient Greek architecture is best known for its temples, many of which are found throughout the region, and the Parthenon is a prime example of this. Later, they will serve as inspiration for Neoclassical architects during the late 18th and the 19th century. The most well-known temples are the Parthenon and the Erechtheion, both on the Acropolis of Athens. Another type of important Ancient Greek buildings were the theatres. Both temples and theatres used a complex mix of optical illusions and balanced ratios.

Looking at the archaeological remains of ancient buildings it is easy to perceive them as limestone and concrete in a grey taupe tone and to make the assumption that ancient buildings were monochromatic. However, architecture was polychromed in much of the Ancient world. One of the most iconic Ancient buildings, the Parthenon (c. 447–432 BC) in Athens, had details painted with vibrant reds, blues and greens. Besides ancient temples, Medieval cathedrals were never completely white. Most had colored highlights on capitals and columns. This practice of coloring buildings and artworks was abandoned during the early Renaissance. This is because Leonardo da Vinci and other Renaissance artists, including Michelangelo, promoted a color palette inspired by the ancient Greco-Roman ruins, which because of neglect and constant decay during the Middle Ages, became white despite being initially colorful. The pigments used in the ancient world were delicate and especially susceptible to weathering. Without necessary care, the colors exposed to rain, snow, dirt, and other factors, vanished over time, and this way Ancient buildings and artworks became white, like they are today and were during the Renaissance.

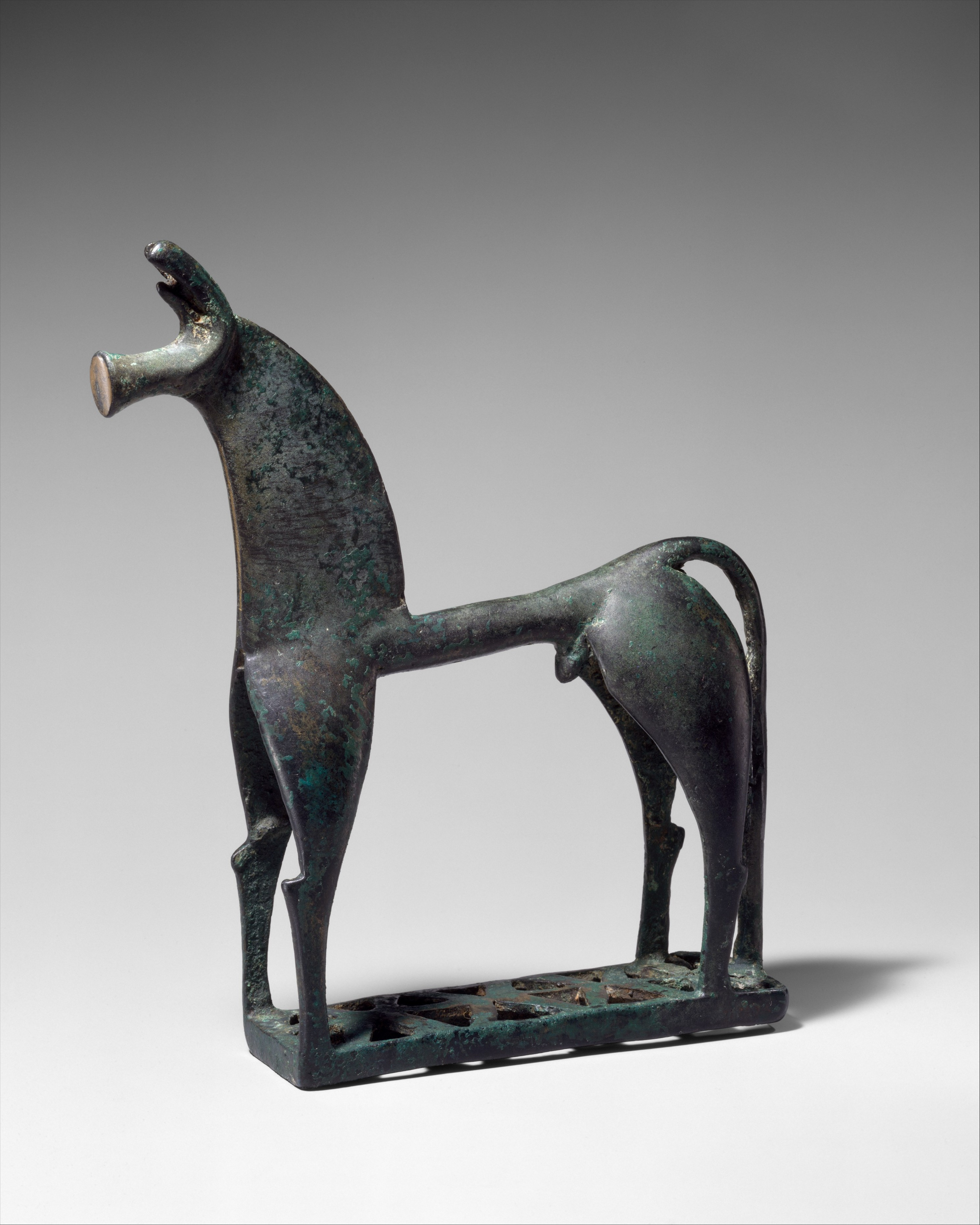
Horse figurine (Geometric); c. 800-700 BC; bronze; height: 17.6 cm; Metropolitan Museum of Art (New York City)

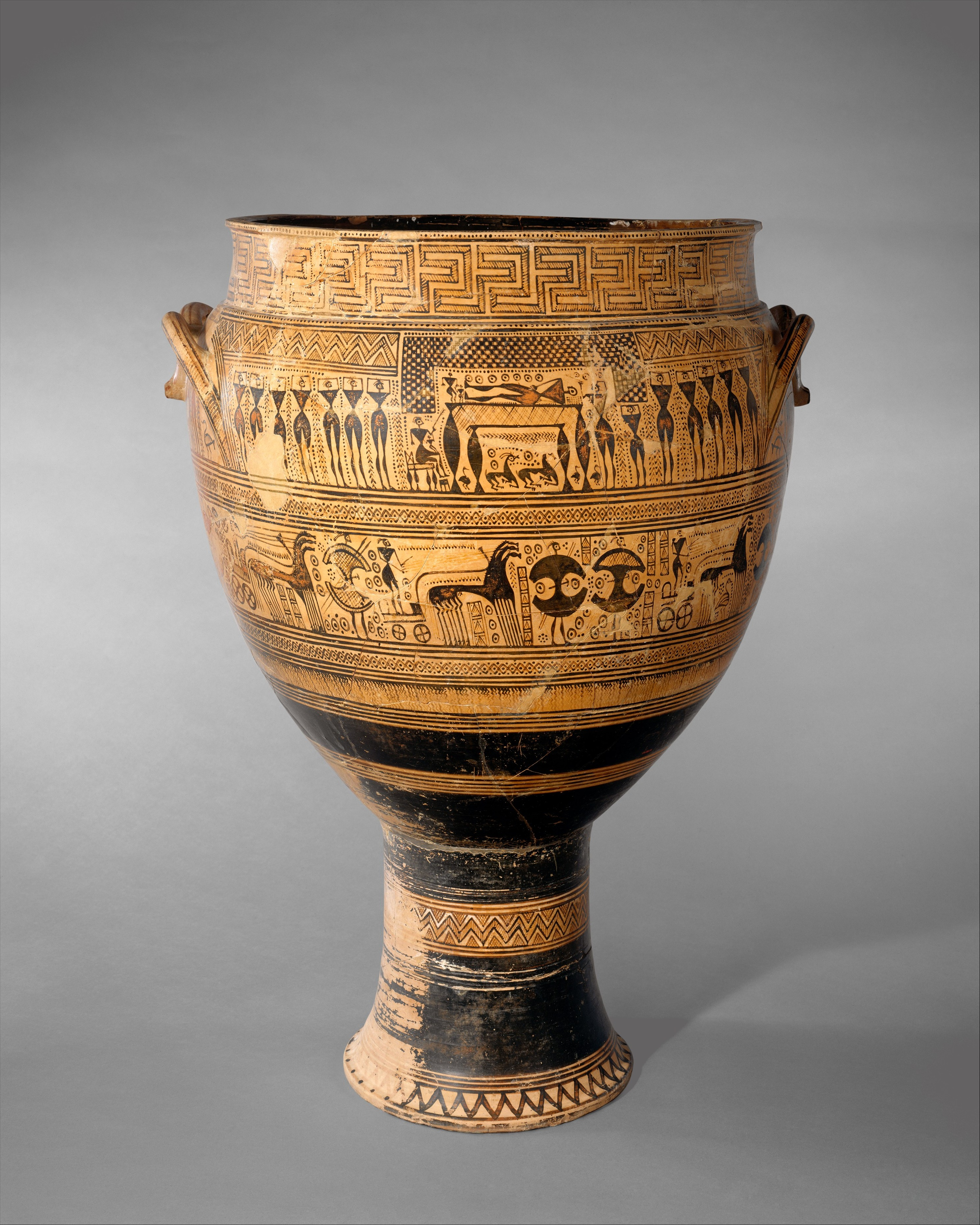
Pedestalled krater (Geometric); c. 750 BC; terracotta; height: 108.3 cm, diameter: 72.4 cm; Metropolitan Museum of Art

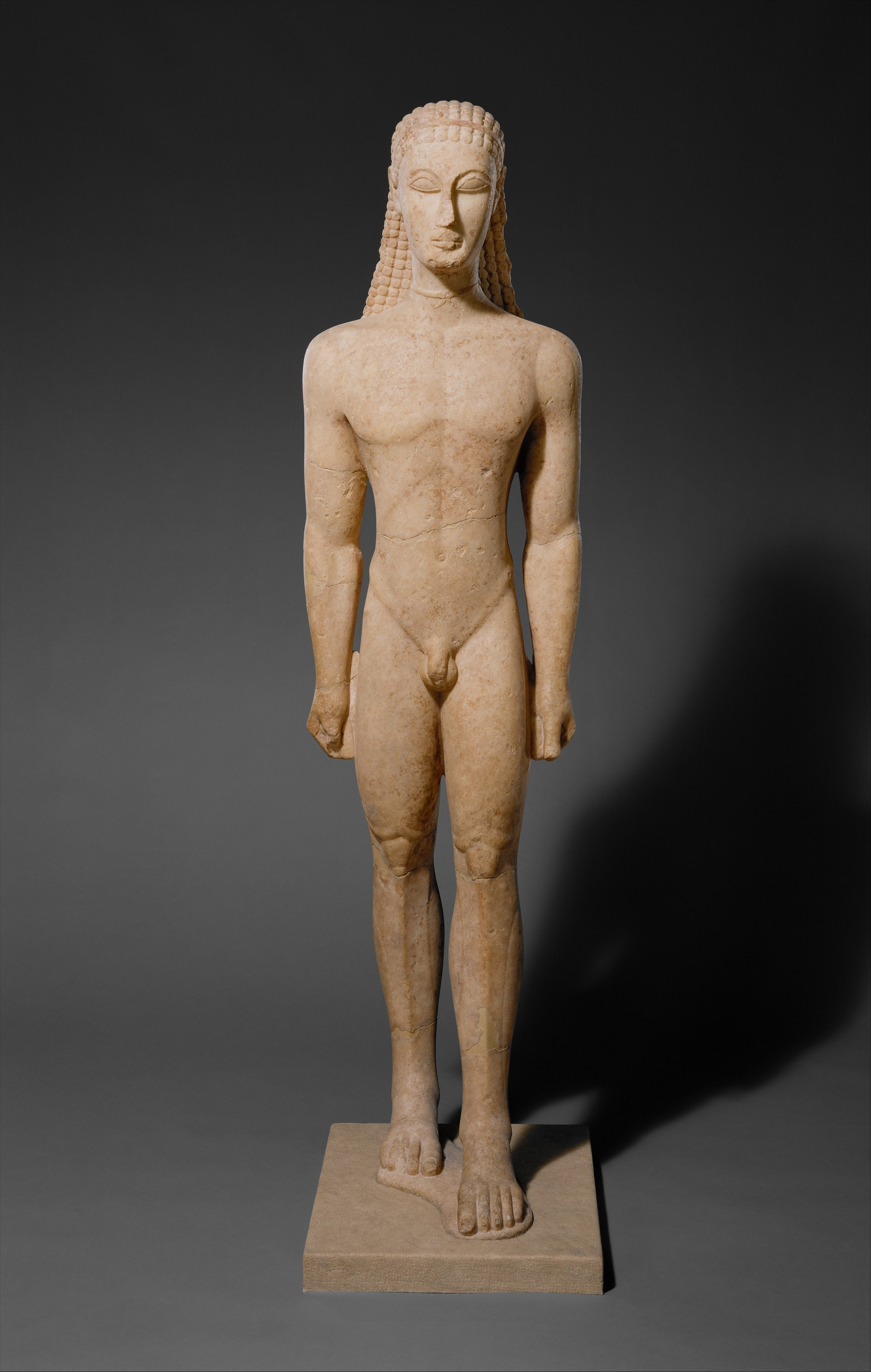
New York Kouros (Archaic); c. 600 BC; marble and pigment; height: 1.95 m; Metropolitan Museum of Art

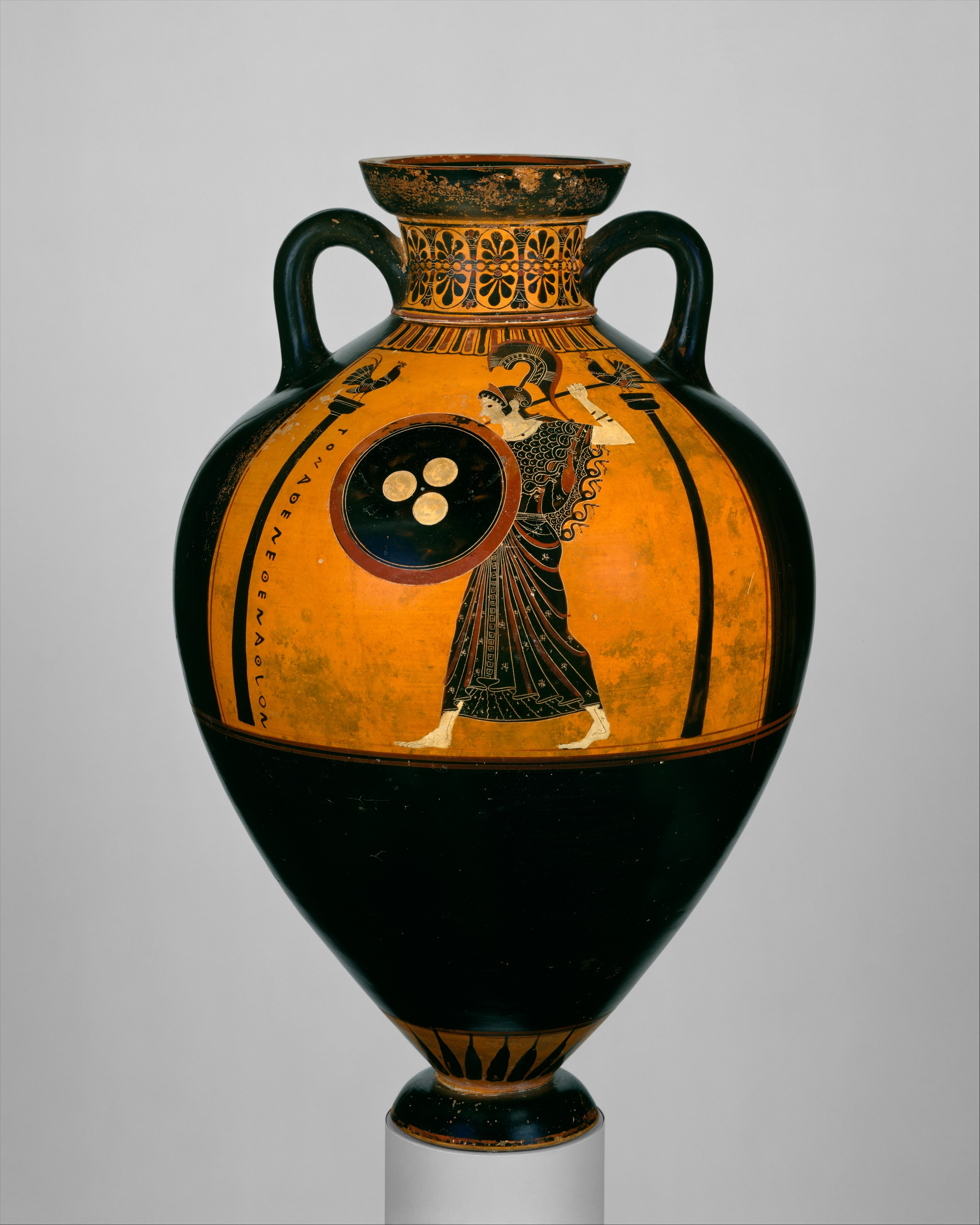
Panathenaic amphora (Archaic); c. 530 BC; ceramic; height: 62.2 cm; Metropolitan Museum of Art

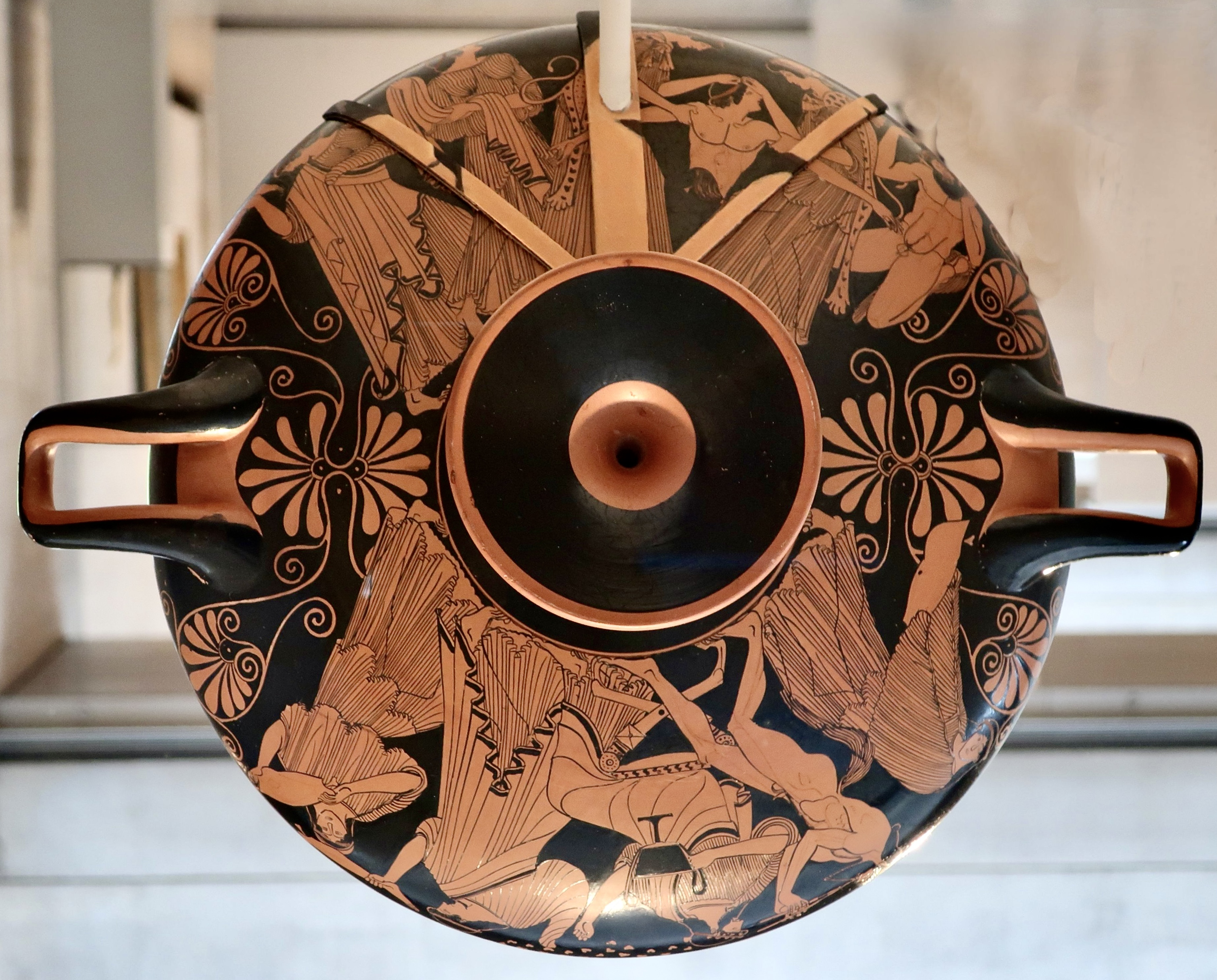
Red-figure kylix (Classical); c. 480 BC; ceramic; height: 12.7 cm, diameter: 27.2 cm; Kimbell Art Museum (Fort Worth, Texas, US)

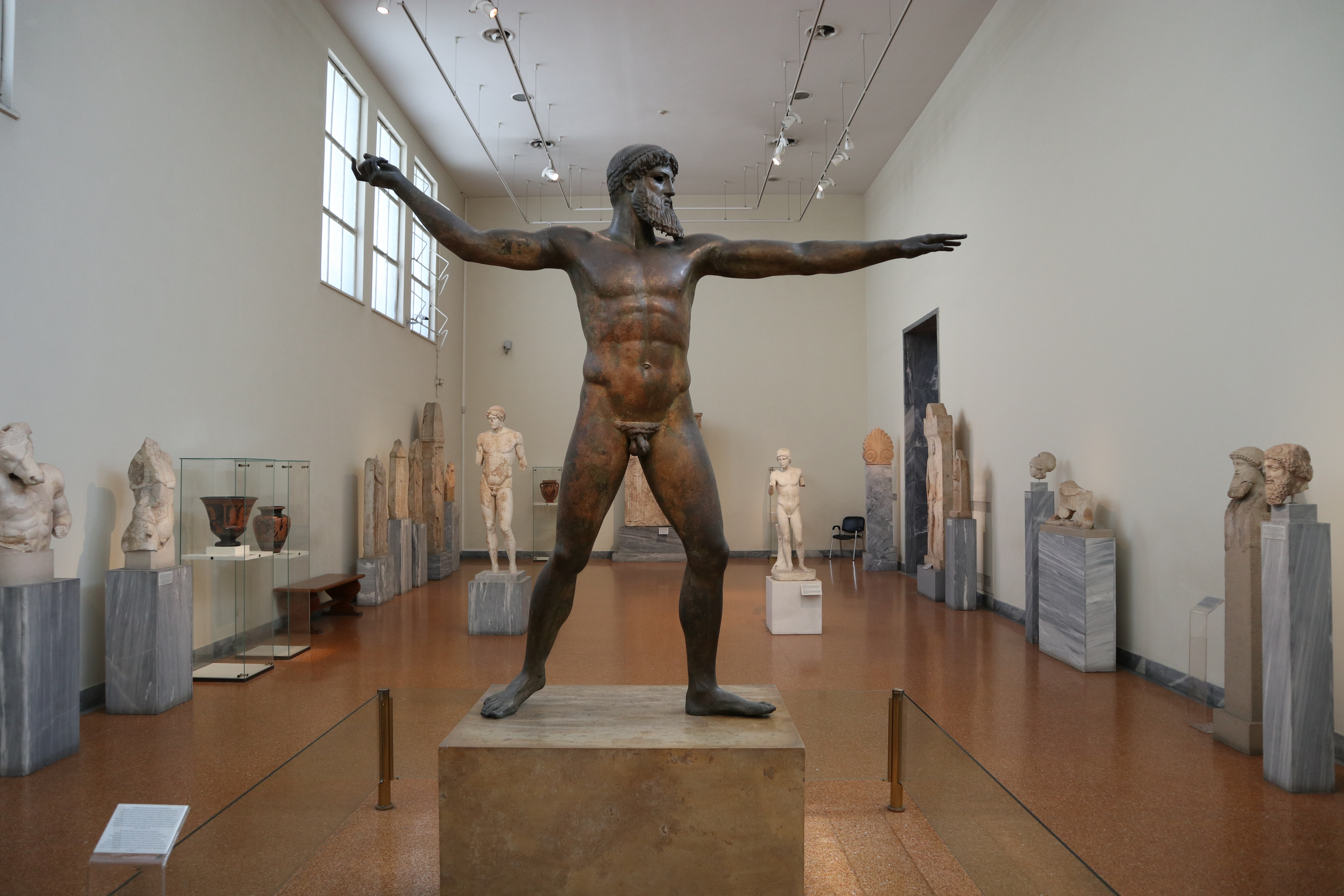
Zeus of Artemision (Classical); c. 460 BC; bronze; height: 209 cm; National Archaeological Museum (Athens, Greece)

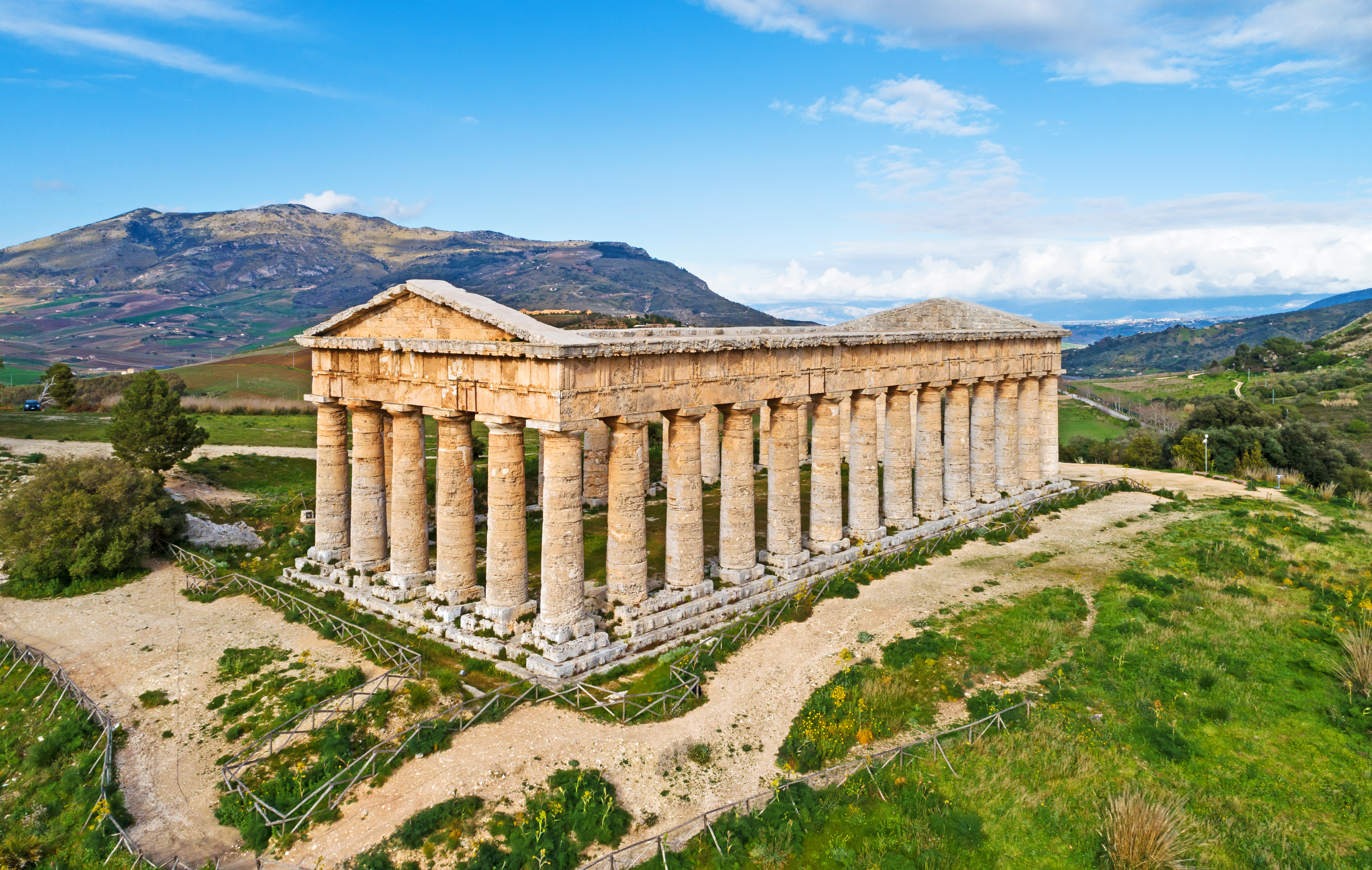
Temple of Segesta (Calatafimi-Segesta, present-day Italy), 5th century BC

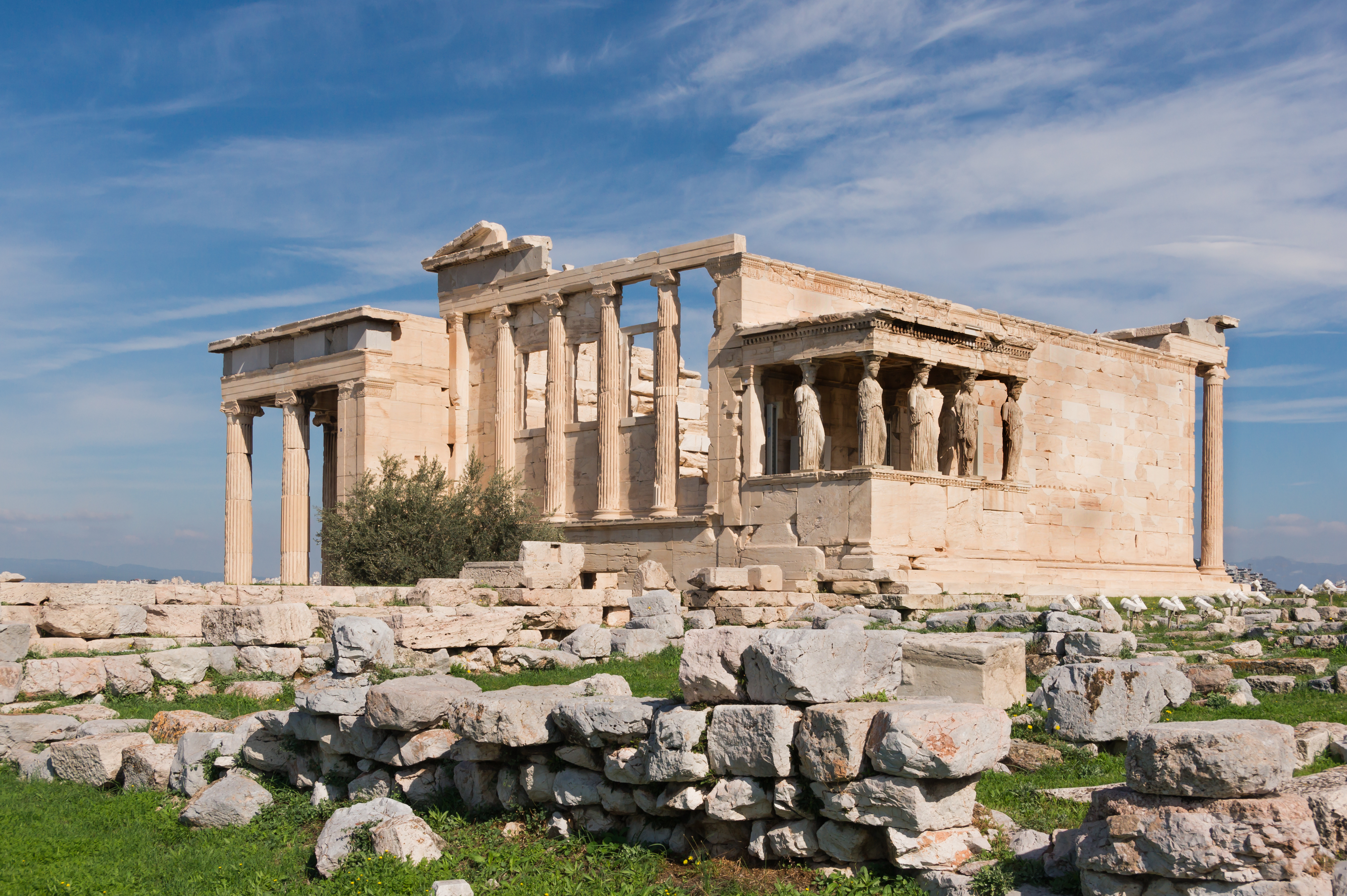
Erechtheion (Athens), with its Ionic columns and caryatid porch, 421-405 BC

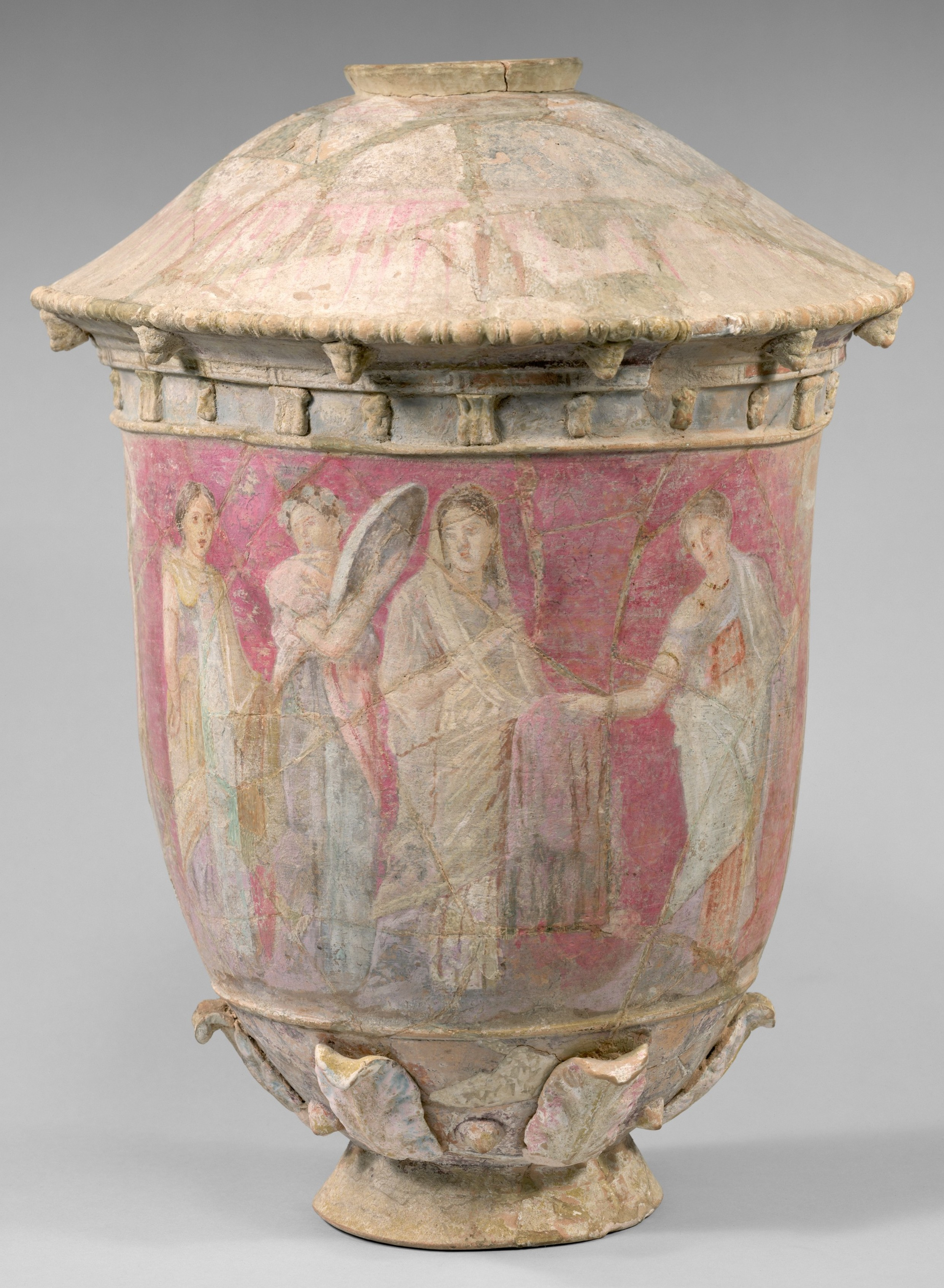
Centuripe vase (Hellenistic); c.300-100 BC; ceramic; height: 9.4 cm; Metropolitan Museum of Art

=== Celtic ===
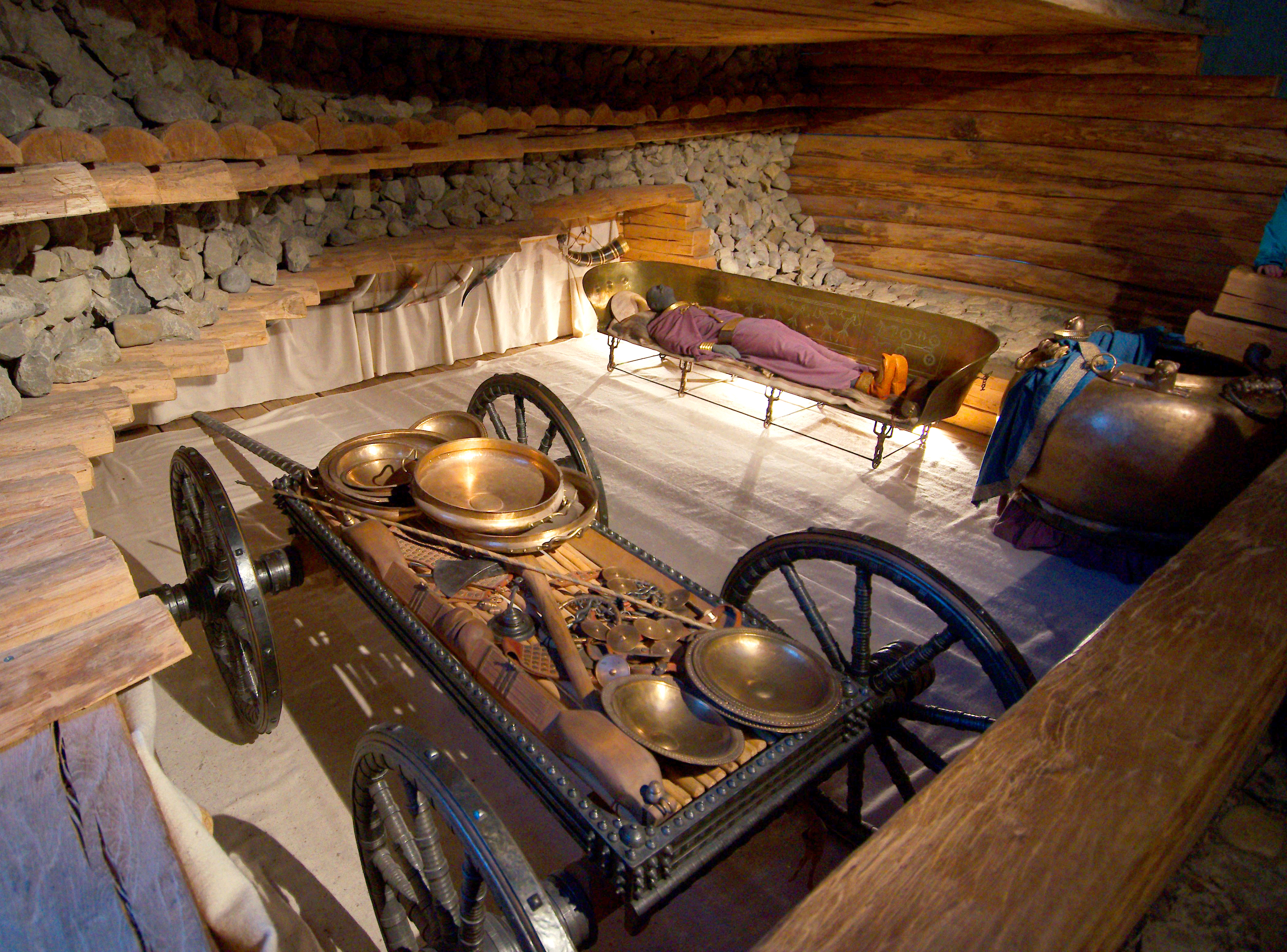
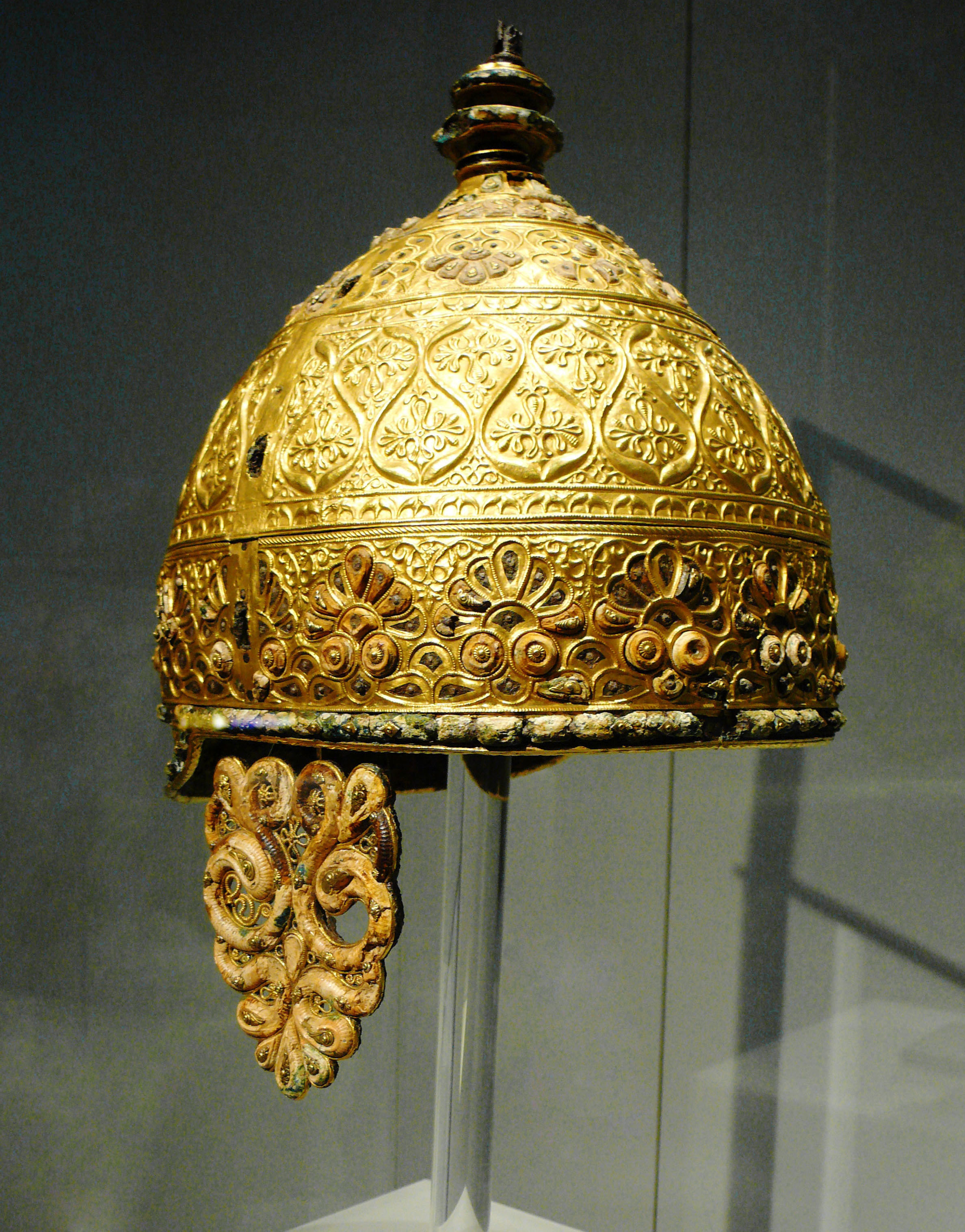
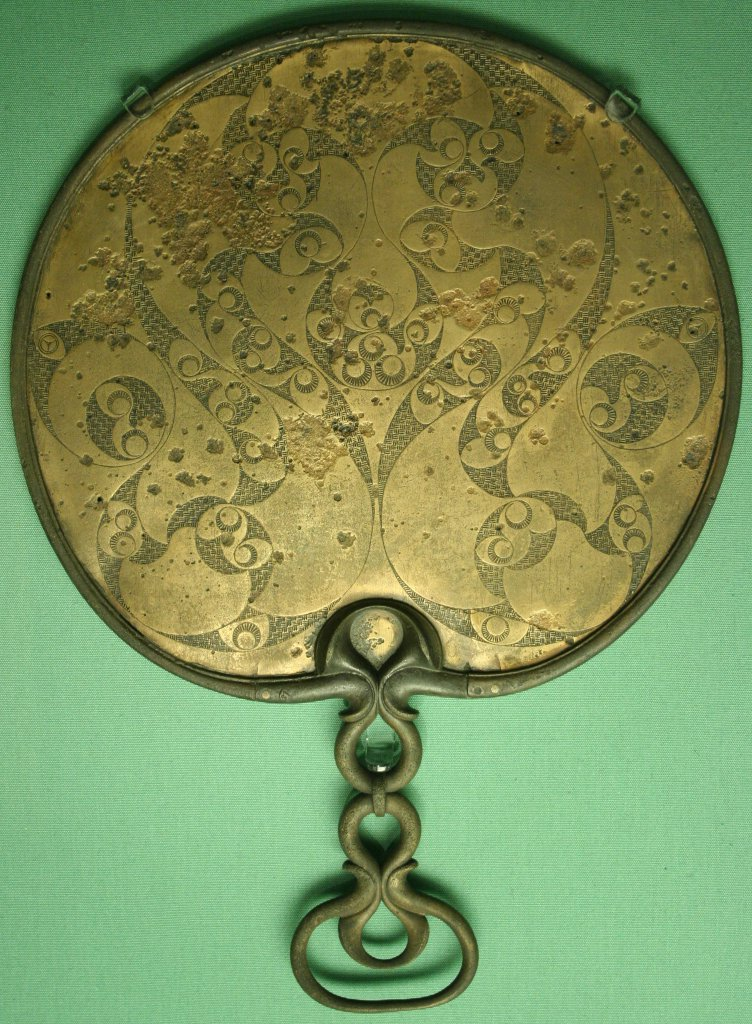
Hochdorf Chieftain's Grave, Germany, c. 530 BC, Agris Helmet, France, 350 BC; Desborough Mirror, Britain, 50 BC – 50 AD

Celtic art, known for its intricate patterns, symbolic motifs, and distinctive designs, evolved over a long period, with its roots stretching back to the early Iron Age. This rich and diverse artistic tradition spans several centuries and regions, primarily encompassing what is today Ireland, Britain, France, and parts of Central and Eastern Europe. The history of Celtic art can be broken down into two key periods:

Hallstatt Culture (circa 800–500 BCE): The earliest recognizable form of Celtic art is associated with the Hallstatt culture, located in what is now Austria and surrounding regions. This period saw the development of distinctive metalworking techniques, especially in gold, bronze, and iron. Artifacts from this time often feature geometric patterns, stylized animal motifs, and abstract spirals.

La Tène Culture (circa 500 BCE – 1 CE): The La Tène culture is considered the height of early Celtic art. During this period, there was a significant increase in the complexity and intricacy of designs. Artisans in La Tène created weapons, jewelry, and everyday items adorned with swirling patterns, knotwork, and stylized animals. This era is also noted for the first significant use of the "Celtic knot", a form of endless loop design that symbolizes eternity and continuity.

=== Rome ===
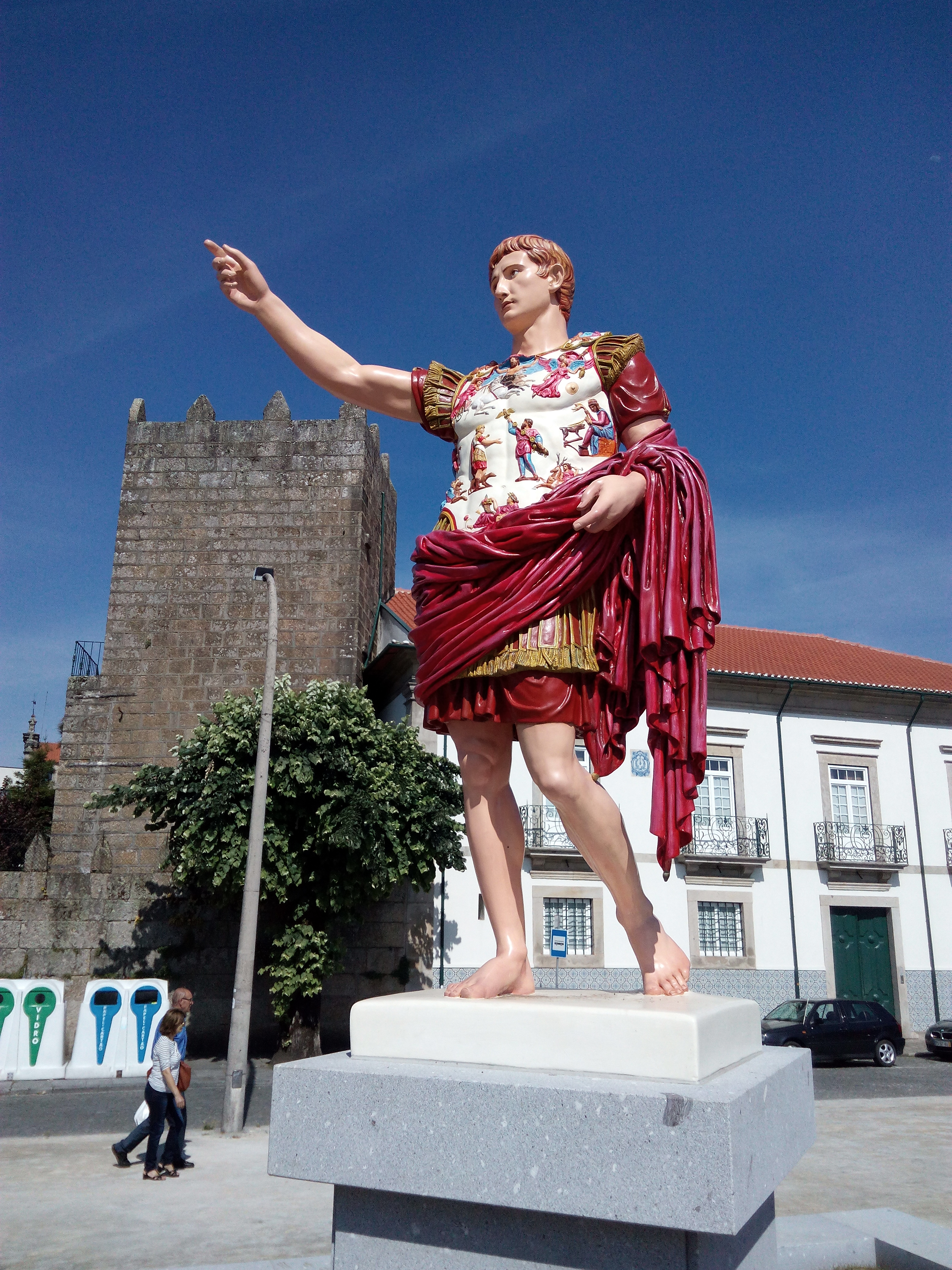
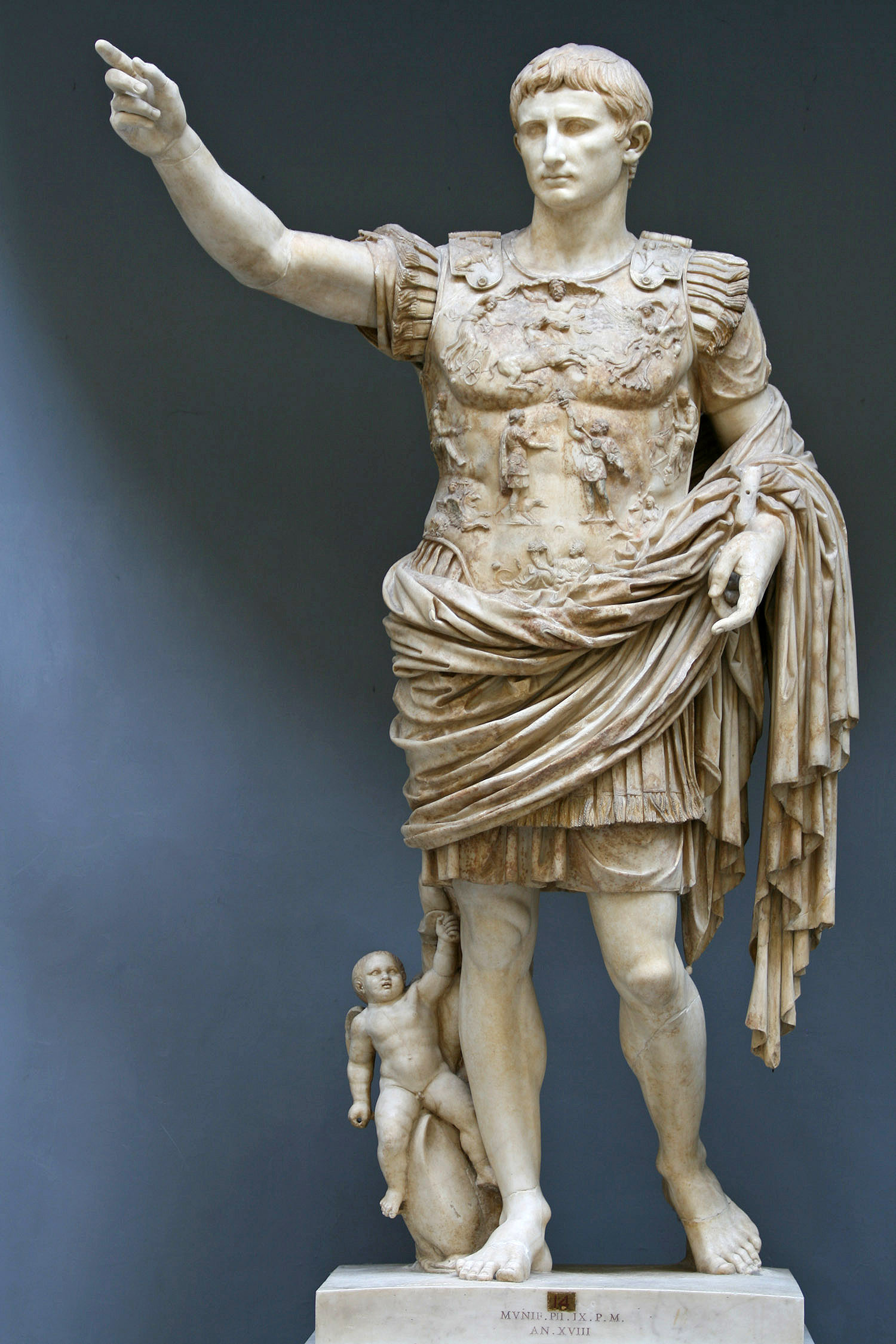
Augustus of Prima Porta (left: a painted reconstruction in Braga, Portugal; right: the marble original statue, c. 20 BC, 2.06 m in Vatican Museums in Vatican City).

No civilization has had an impact as enduring and powerful on Western art as the Roman Empire. The legacy of ancient Rome is evident through the medieval and early modern periods, and Roman art continues to be reused in the modern era in both traditionalist and postmodern artworks. Sometimes it is viewed as derived from Greek precedents, but also has its own distinguishing features, some of them inherited from Etruscan art. Roman sculpture is often less idealized than its Greek precedents, being very realistic. Roman architecture often used concrete, and features such as the round arch and dome were invented. Luxury objects in metal-work, gem engraving, ivory carvings, and glass are sometimes considered in modern terms to be minor forms of Roman art, although this would not necessarily have been the case for contemporaries. An innovation made possible by the Roman development of glass-blowing was cameo glass. A white 'shell' was first created, into which coloured glass was then blown so as to produce an interior lining. The white shell was then cut down to create relief patterns of white against a darker background. They also made mosaics, this way producing durable pictorial art with cut-stone cubes (tesserae) and/or chips of coloured terracotta and glass. Some villas of wealthy Romans had their walls covered with frescos, aimed at dazziling and entertaining guests. Much of Roman wall painting that survives comes from sites around the Bay of Naples, in particular Pompeii and Herculaneum, thriving towns that were preserved under metres of volcanic debris when Mount Vesuvius erupted in 79 AD. As a result, Roman wall painting is often discussed in terms of four 'Pompeian styles'.

The Romans were deeply influenced by all aspects of Hellenistic culture. In architecture, just like in other art media, they essentially adopted the Classical language and adapted it to new situations and uses. The Romans also have their own innovations brought to Classical architecture. They used the Doric, Ionic and Corinthian orders in a far freer manner than the Greeks had, creating their own version of the Doric and using the Corinthian far more frequently. They also added two new orders to the repertoire: the Tuscan, a simpler, more massive version of the Doric derived from Etruscan architecture; and the Composite, a combination of the scroll-like volutes of the Ionic with the Corinthian's acanthus leaves. Other important innovations include the arch, and the dome. Using arches, they built aqueducts and monumental triumphal arches. Roman emperors were proud of their conquests, and commemorated them at home and in the conquered territories through triumphal arches, a good example of this being the Arch of Constantine in Rome. Between 30 and 15 BC, the architect and civil and military engineer Marcus Vitruvius Pollio published a majore treatise, De Architectura, which influenced architects around the world for centuries.

After the Middle Ages, with the Renaissance that started in Florence (Italy), a growing interest for ancient Rome started. During it, for the first time since Classical Antiquity, art became convincingly lifelike. The Renaissance also sparked interest for ancient Greek and Roman literature, not just for art and architecture.

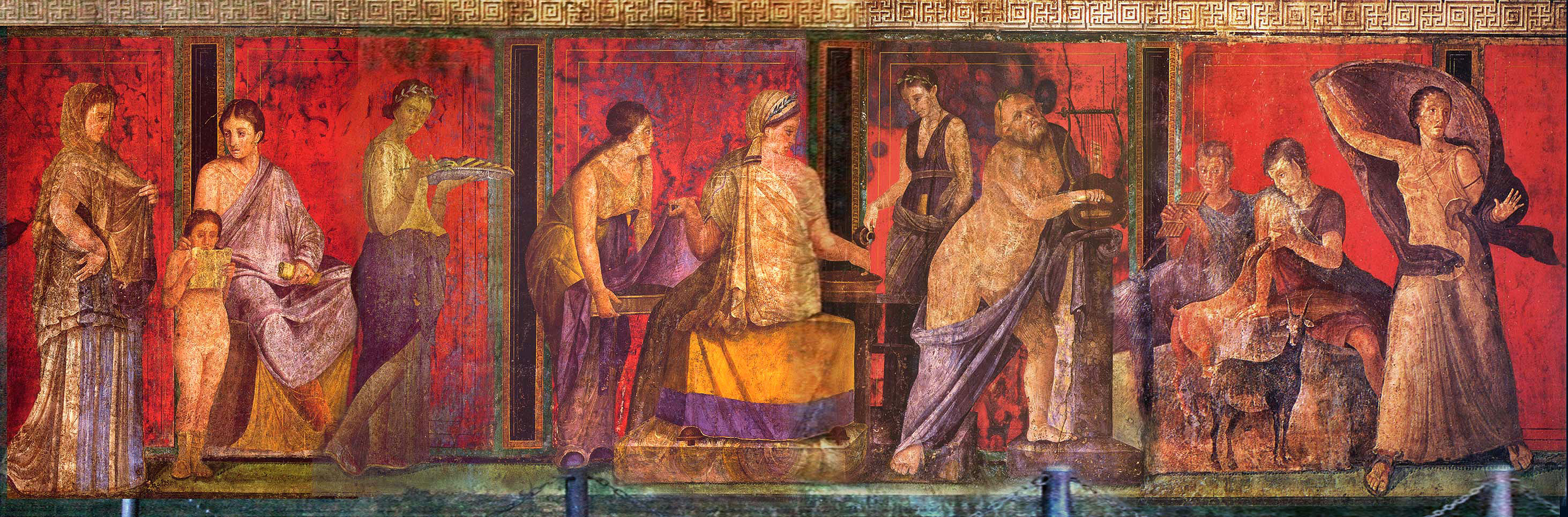
Mysteries Fresco; mid-1st century BC; fresco; height: 1.62 m; Villa of the Mysteries (Pompeii, Italy)

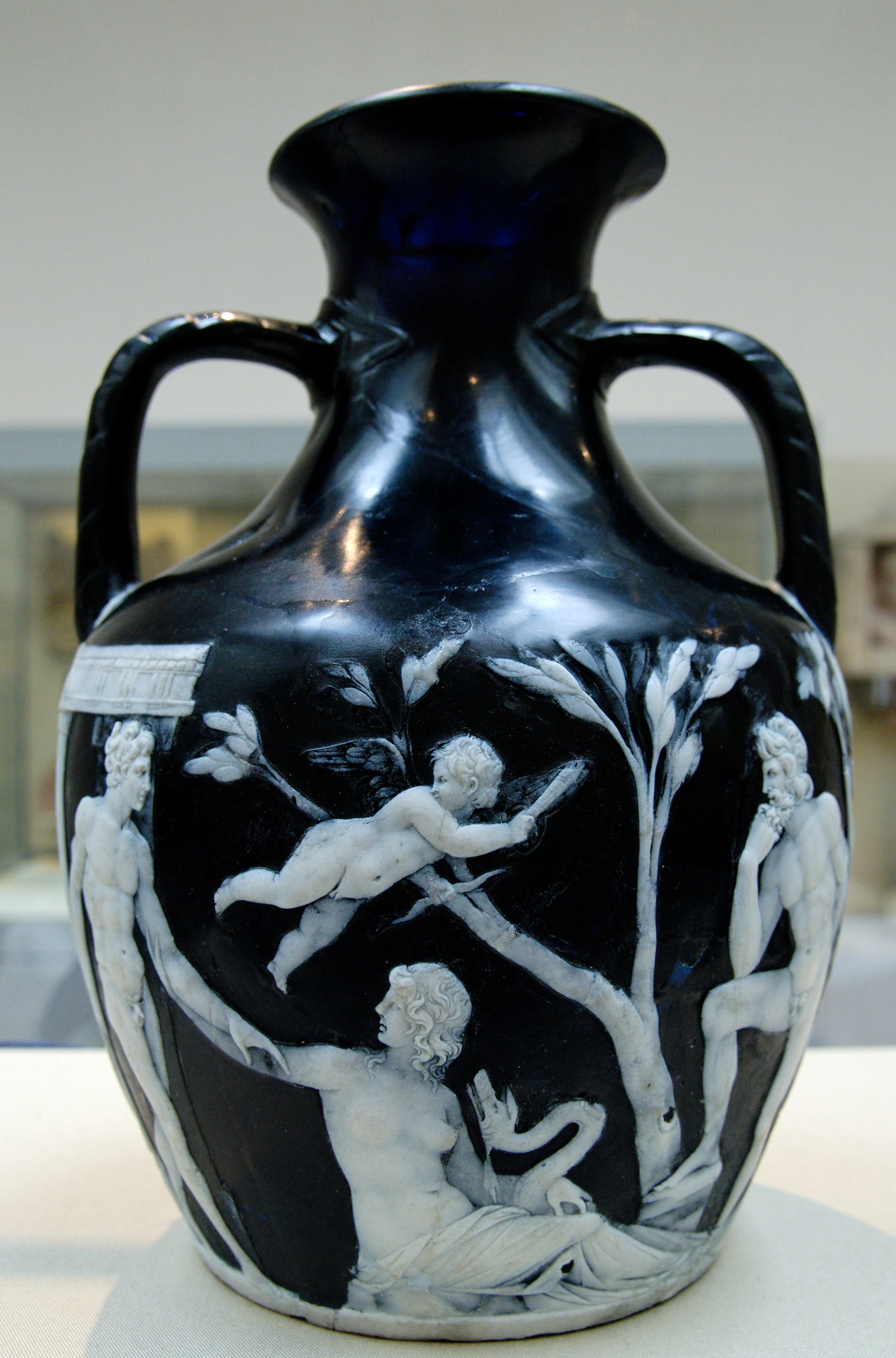
Portland Vase; late 1st century BC; glass; height: 24 cm; British Museum (London)

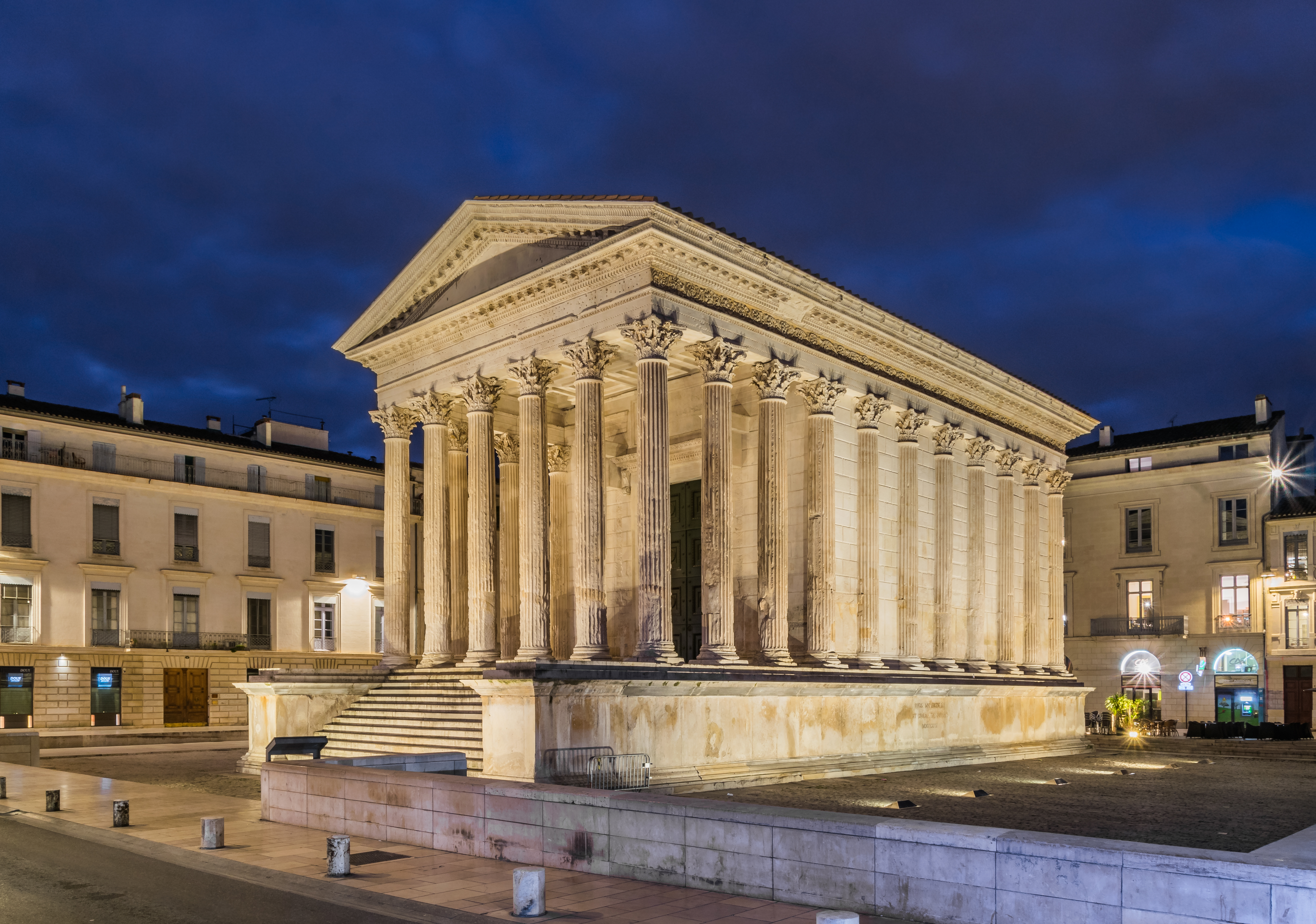
The Maison Carrée (Nîmes, France), one of the best-preserved Roman temples, c. 2nd century AD

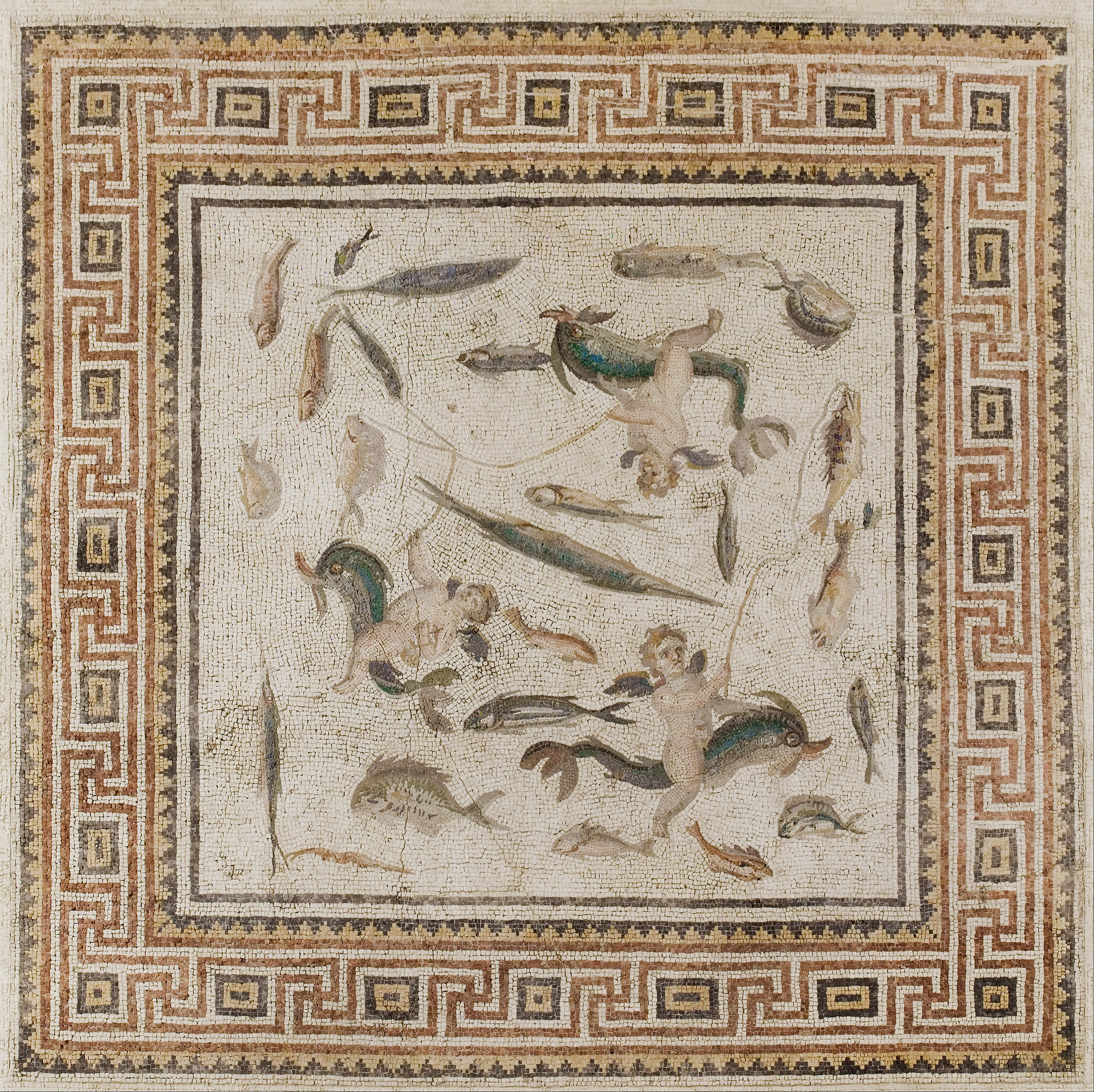
Marine mosaic (central panel of three panels from a floor); 200–230; mosaic (stone and glass tesserae); 2,915 mm x 2,870 mm; Museum of Fine Arts (Boston, US)

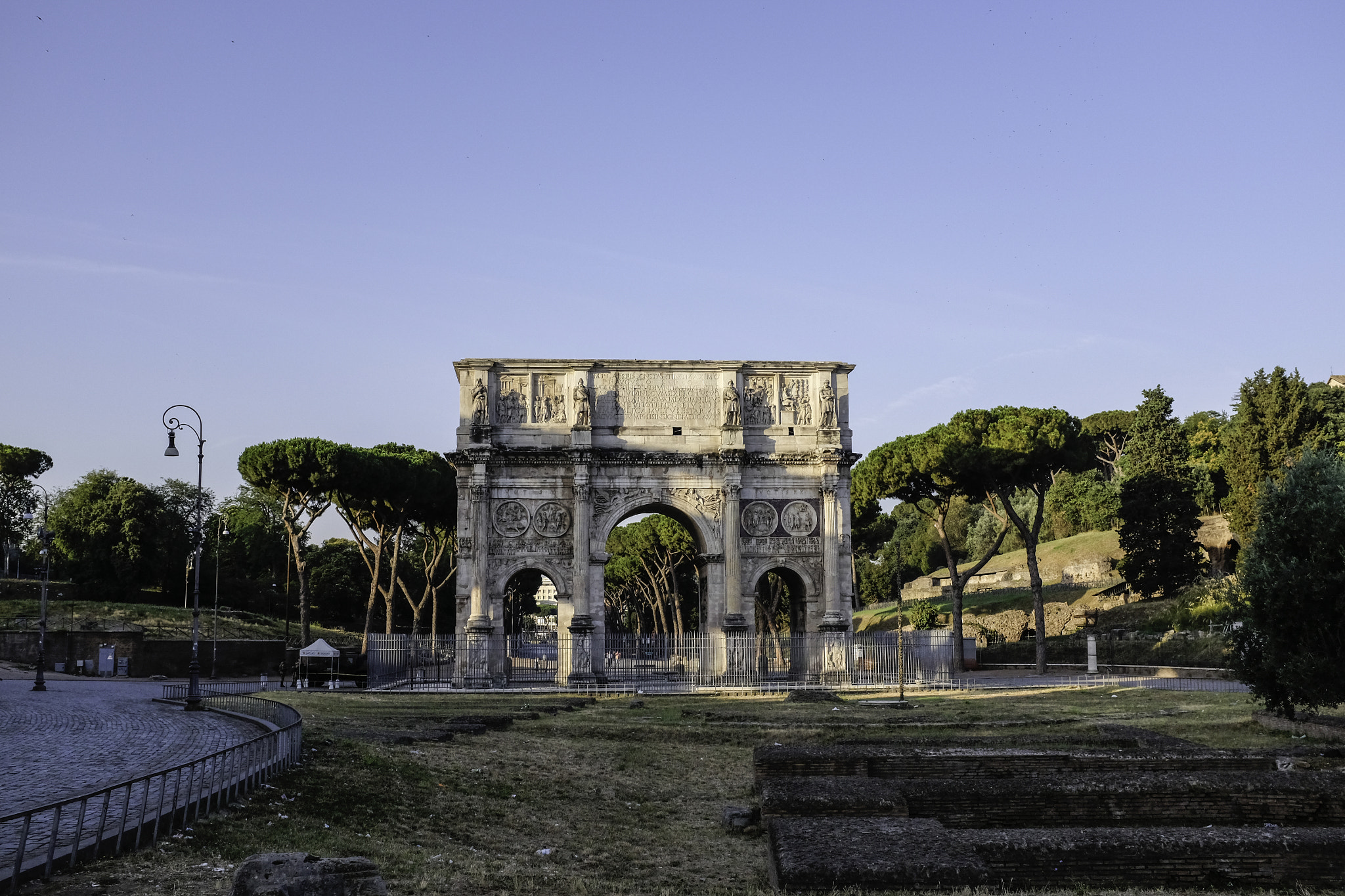
Arch of Constantine (Rome), that commemorates the triumph of Constantine the Great after his victory over Maxentius in the Battle of the Milvian Bridge, 316

=== Germanic ===
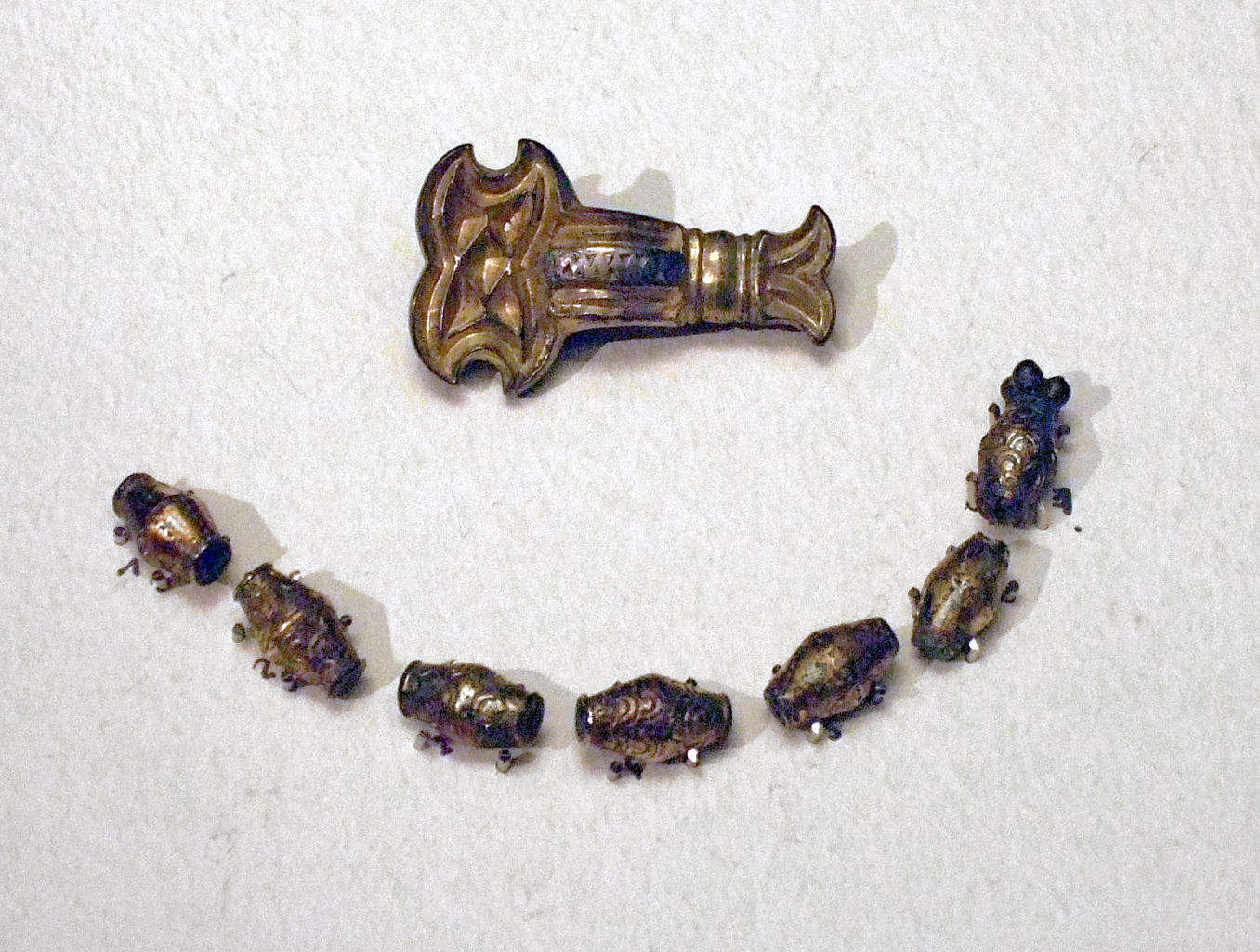
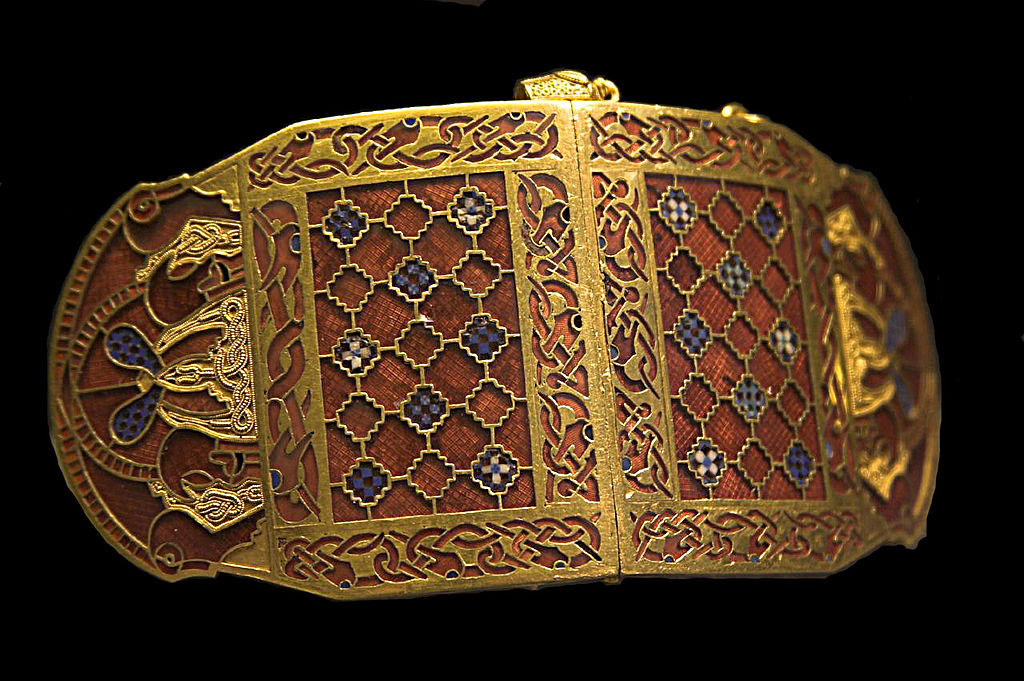
(left: fibula and beads in Schwanbeck, Germany; right: Shoulder-clasps from the 7th century Anglo-Saxon ship burial at Sutton Hoo, UK, in British Museum in London).

Germanic art during the Migration Period (c. 300–900 CE) reflects the cultural and artistic developments of the Germanic peoples as they migrated across Europe and settled in various regions, including the area now known as Germany. This period, which accompanied and followed the collapse of the Western Roman Empire, saw the Germanic peoples engage in artistic traditions that were both influenced by and distinct from Roman styles while founding Germanic kingdoms which were states established by various non-Roman (primarily Germanic) peoples in Europe and North Africa following the collapse of the Western Roman Empire in the fifth century. The barbarian kingdoms were the principal governments in Western Europe in the Early Middle Ages. The time of the barbarian kingdoms is considered to have come to an end with Charlemagne's coronation as emperor in 800, though a handful of small Anglo-Saxon kingdoms persisted until Alfred the Great and his successors unified them from the late-9th century onwards.

One of the key artistic styles in early Germanic territories was the animal style, which spread through the Eurasian steppe, then developed in Scandinavia and northern Germany and exerted influence across Europe. This style, characterized by intricate and abstract representations of animals, was common in metalwork and personal adornment. In modern-day Germany, the Rhine and Upper Rhine regions were notable centers for these works, with the use of zoomorphic patterns seen in items like brooches, buckles, and jewelry. A famous example of this style is the Bingerbrück fibula, a decorative brooch found in the Rhineland, showcasing the characteristic intertwining animal forms typical of Germanic art. The style is also evident in artifacts from the Sutton Hoo treasure, where similar animal motifs appear in Anglo-Saxon art but reflect the broader influence of Germanic art across northern Europe.

The polychrome style, developed by the Goths in the Black Sea region, had a significant impact on Germanic art, especially in southern Germany and across parts of France and Spain. Known for its use of gold and precious stones, this style was evident in items such as garnet-inlaid brooches and belt buckles. Objects such as the Visigothic crown of Recceswinth found in Spain show the reach of this style, but similar examples of polychrome metalwork have been uncovered in Germany, particularly in the Frankish kingdom, where these items often had both decorative and symbolic roles.

In the 6th and 7th centuries, the Germanic peoples began to adopt Christianity, leading to a shift in their artistic traditions. Christian symbols began to emerge in Germanic art, marking a move away from purely pagan motifs. The introduction of Christian iconography into Germanic metalwork and manuscripts led to the development of Carolingian art and other regional styles across Europe. In Germany, this period saw the rise of Frankish art, particularly under the reign of Charlemagne (r. 768–814), which blended Germanic traditions with Christian imagery.

== Islamic ==
Islamic art is well-known since the Middle Ages for the use of elaborate geometric patterns, colourful tiles, stylized natural motifs and detailed calligraphy. Rarely has lettering had such a profound impact on applied arts and architecture. Islam appeared in western Arabia in the 7th century AD through revelations delivered to the prophet Muhammad in Mecca. Within a century of Muhammad's death the Islamic empires controlled the Middle East, Spain and parts of Asia and Africa. Because of this, similarly with Roman art, Islamic art and architecture had regional versions. As the Islamic world extended into centres of late antique culture, it was enriched by philosophical and intellectual movements. The translation of Greek works into Arabic and advances in mathematics and science were encouraged by early caliphates. This is in contrast with the modern perception that Islamic art is dogmatic and unchanging. Human and animal representation wasn't rare. Only certain periods restricted it (similar to the Byzantine Iconoclasm).

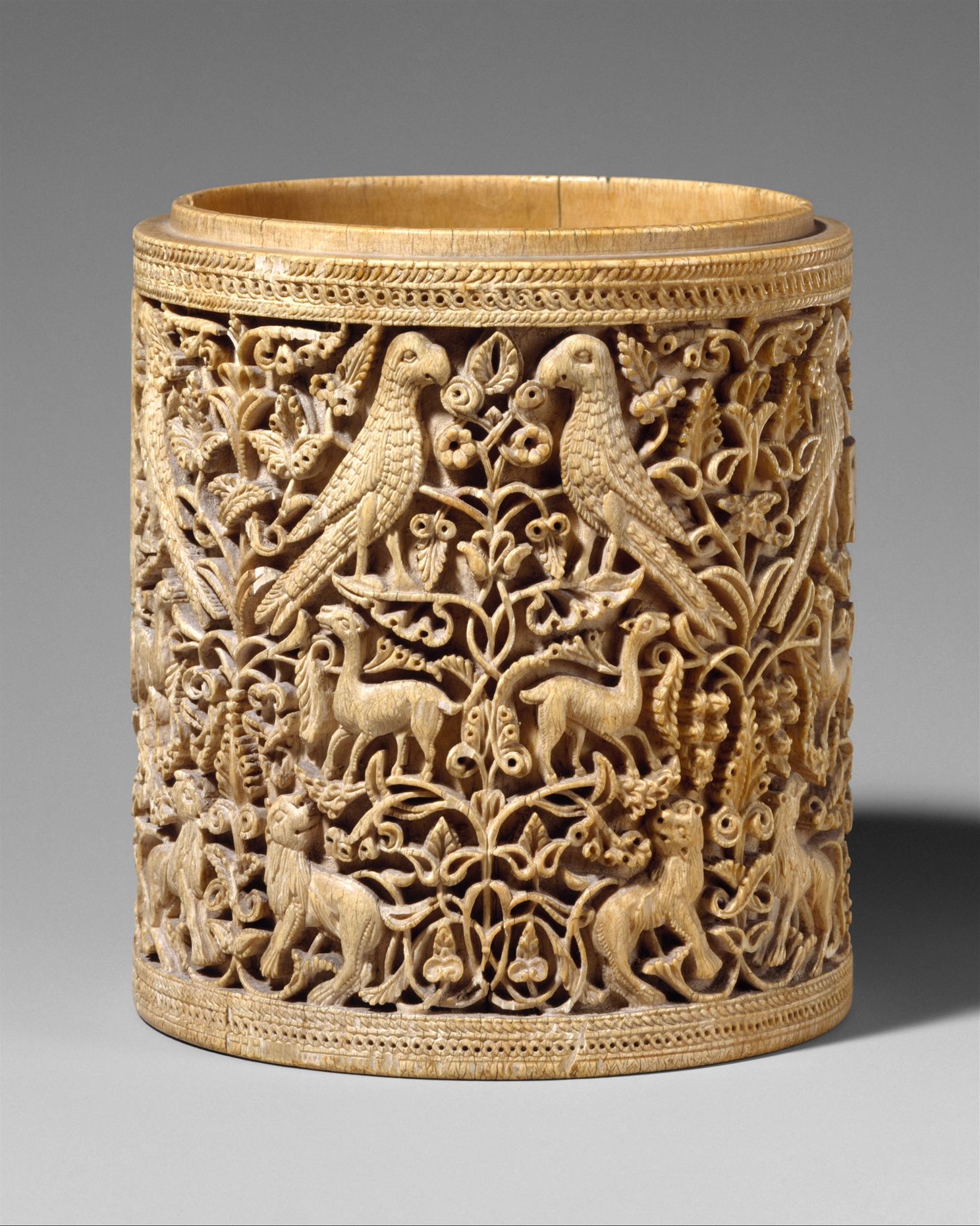
Perfume box; 950–975; ivory; height: 11.7 cm; Metropolitan Museum of Art (New York City)

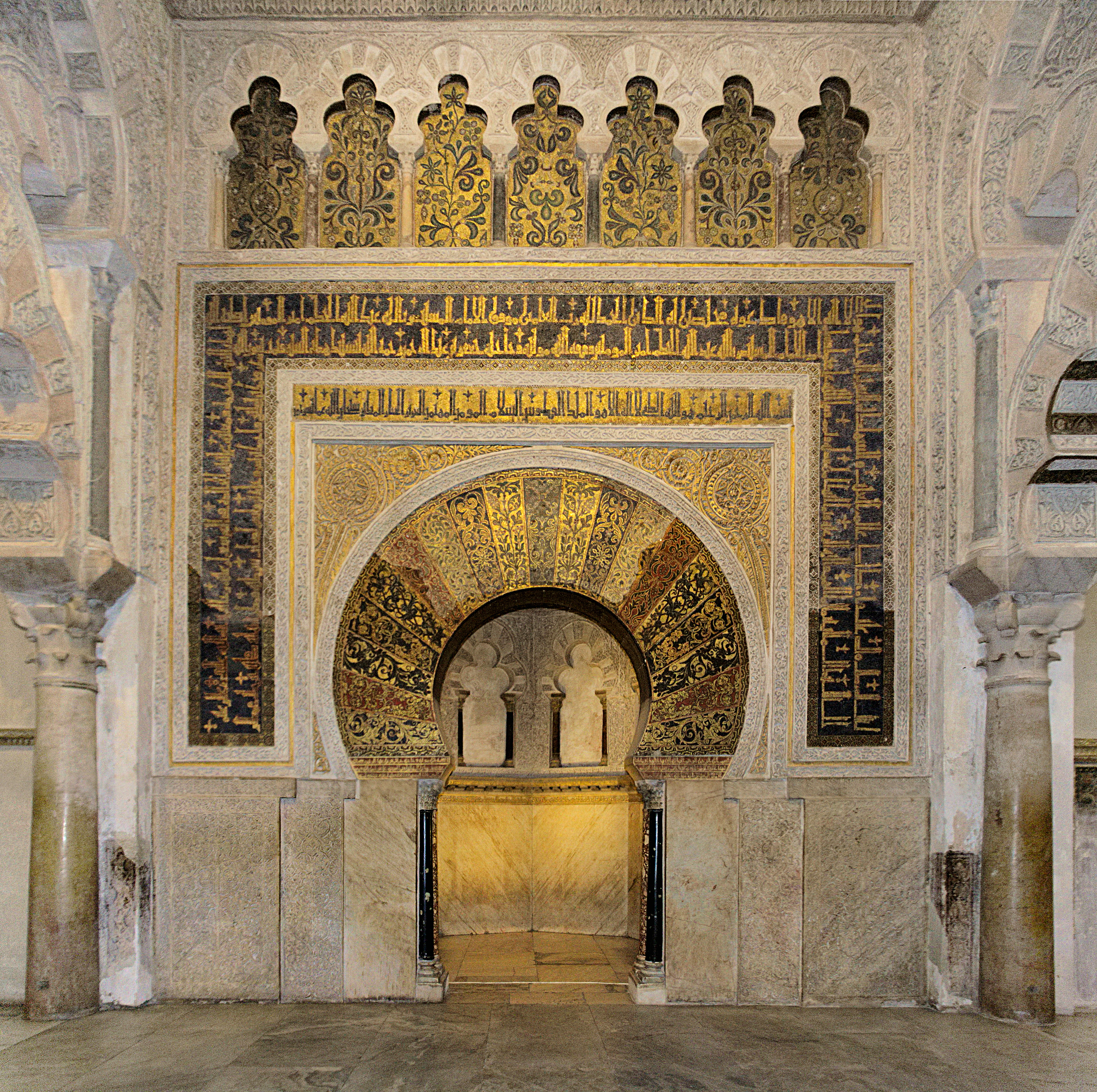
Mihrab; 961–976; stucco and glass mosaic; diameter (internal arch): c. 2.3 m; Mosque–Cathedral of Córdoba (Córdoba, Spain)

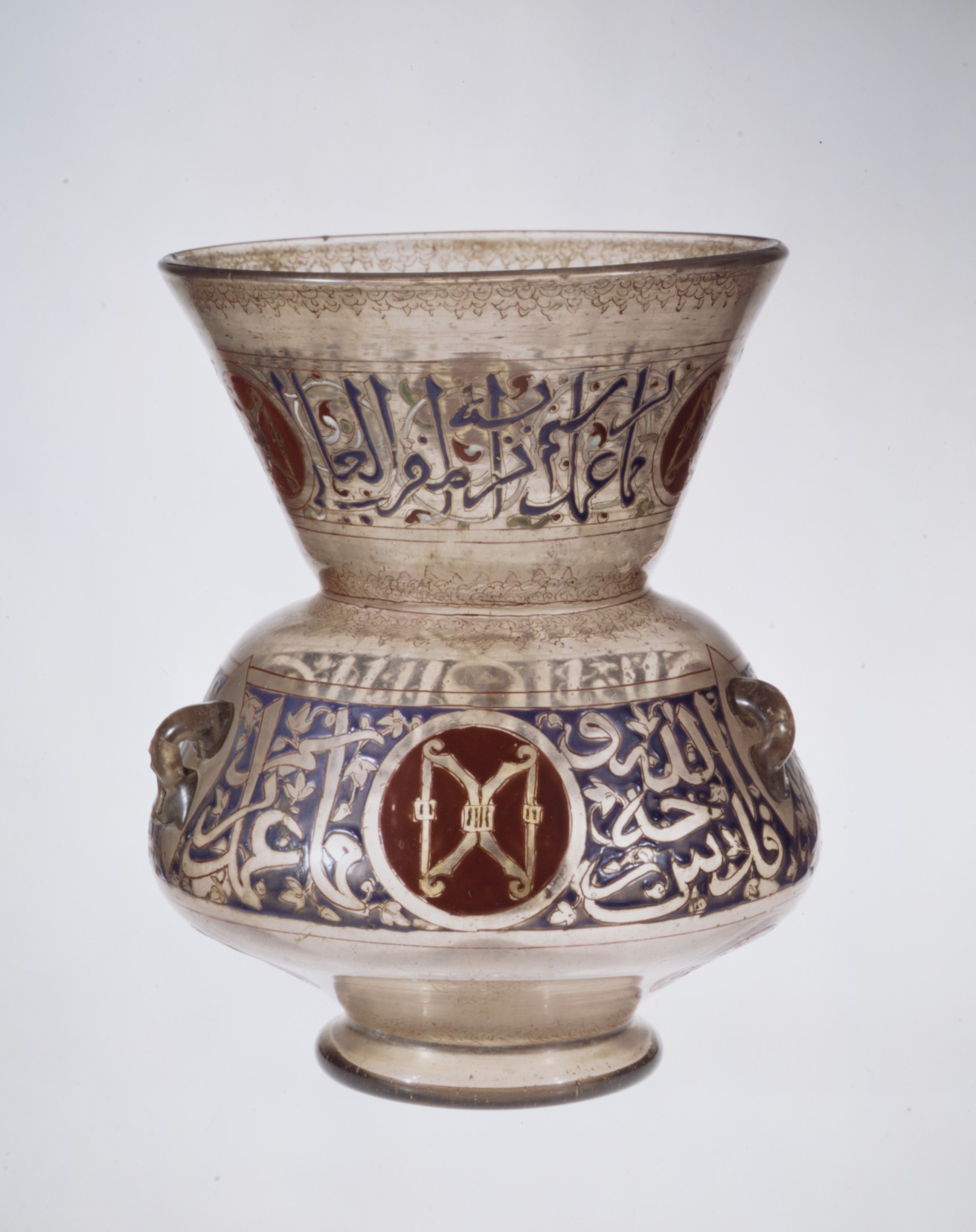
Mosque lamp; c. 1285; glass, enamels and gold; height: 26.4 cm; Metropolitan Museum of Art

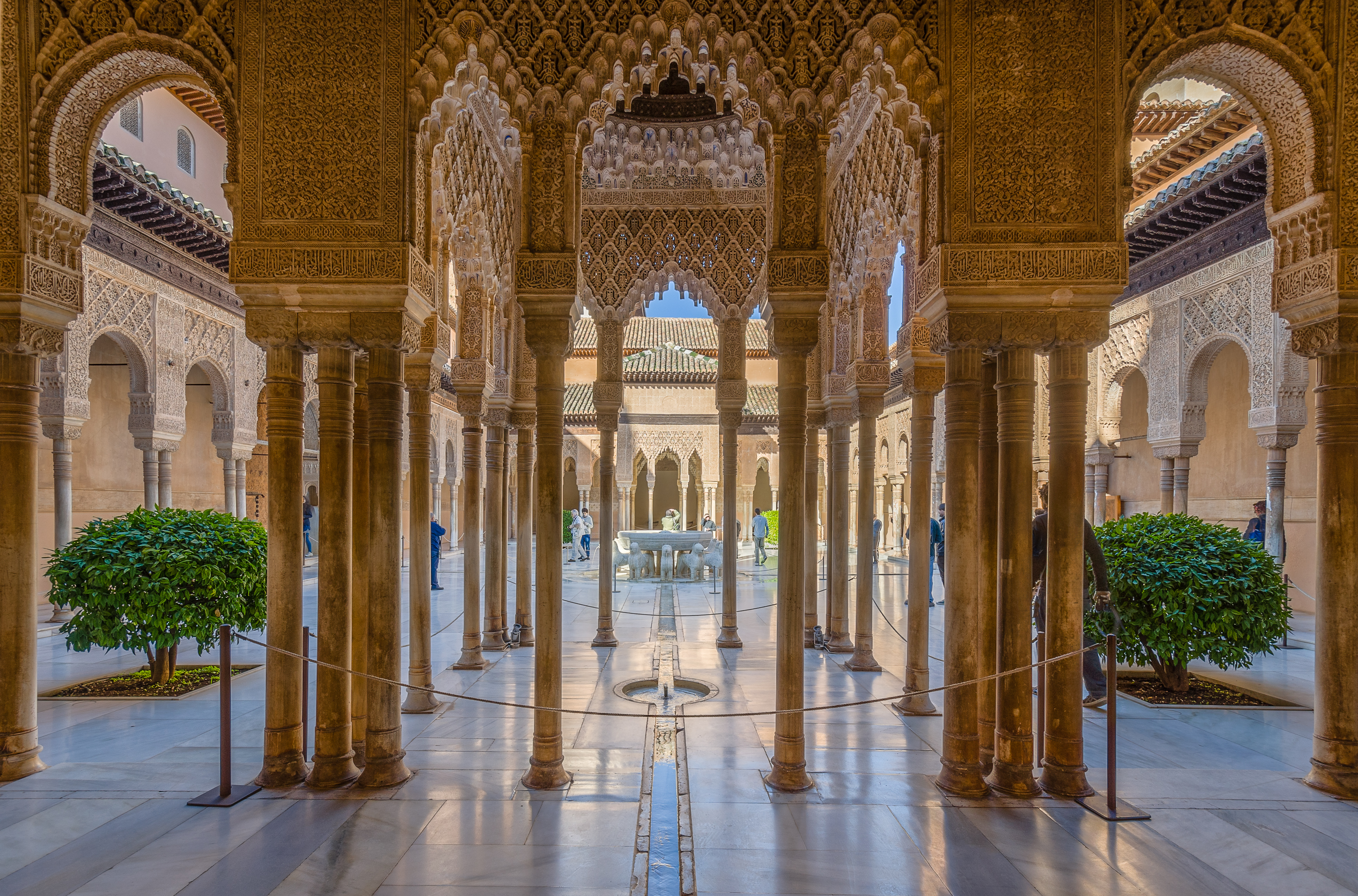
Court of the Lions (Alhambra, Granada, Spain), 1362-1391

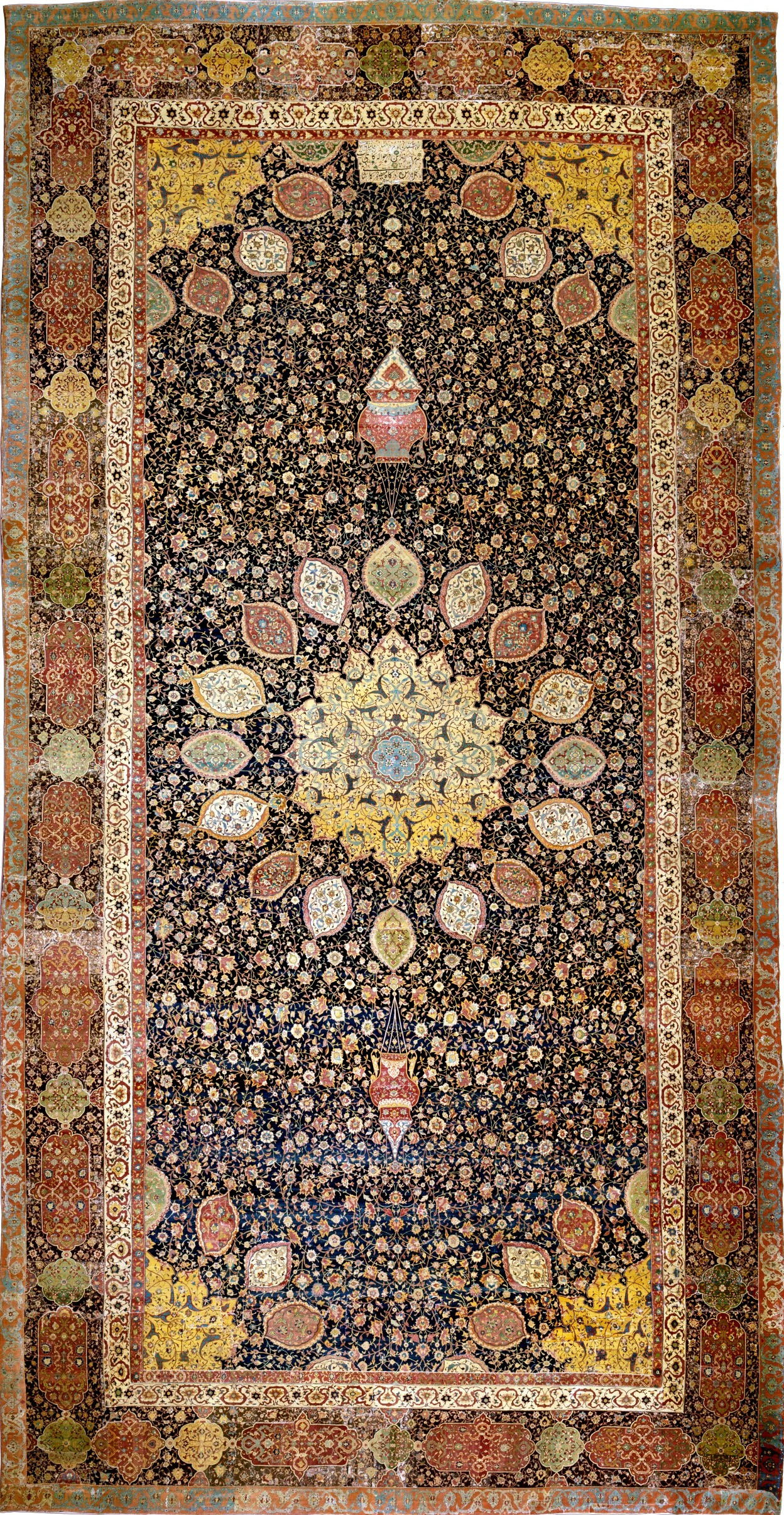
Ardabil Carpet; 1539–1540; wool pile on silk; length: 10.51 m; Victoria and Albert Museum (London)

== Americas ==
=== Mesoamerica ===
Some of the first great civilizations in the Americas developed in Mesoamerica (meaning 'middle Americas'), the most well known being the Mayans and the Aztecs.

The Olmecs (c.1400–400 BC) were the first major civilization in modern-day Mexico. Many elements of Mesoamerican civilizations, like the practice of building of pyramids, the complex calendar, the pantheon of gods and hieroglyphic writing have origins in Olmec culture. They produced jade and ceramic figurines, colossal heads and pyramids with temples at the top, all without the advantage of metal tools. For them, jadeite was a stone more precious than gold and symbolized divine powers and fertility. 17 Olmec colossal heads have been discovered, each weighing a few tons. Each head, with the flattened nose and thick lips, wears a helmet, similar to the ones worn during official ball games, possibly representing kings of officials.

The Maya civilization began around 1800 BC and grew until the arrival of Spanish colonizers in the 1500s. They occupied southeast Mexico, Guatemala, Belize, and parts of Honduras and El Salvador. The Mayans were trading with cities, like Teotihuacán, but also with many Mesoamerican civilizations, like the Zapotecs or the other groups from central or coast areas of Mexico, and also with populations that did not inhabit Mesoamerican territories, like the Taíno from the Caribbean. They produced impressive king portraits, polychrome ceramic vessels, earthenware figures, wooden sculptures, stelae, and built complex cities with pyramids. Most of the well preserved polychrome ceramic vessels were discovered in the tombs of nobles.

Arising from humble beginnings as a nomadic group, the Aztecs created the largest empire in Mesoamerican history, lasting from 1427 to 1521. They did not call themselves 'Aztecs', but Mexica. The term Aztecs was assigned by historians. They transformed the capital of their empire, Tenochtitlan, into a place where artists of Mesoamerica created impressive artworks for their new masters. The present-day Mexico City was built over the Aztec capital, Tenochtitlan.

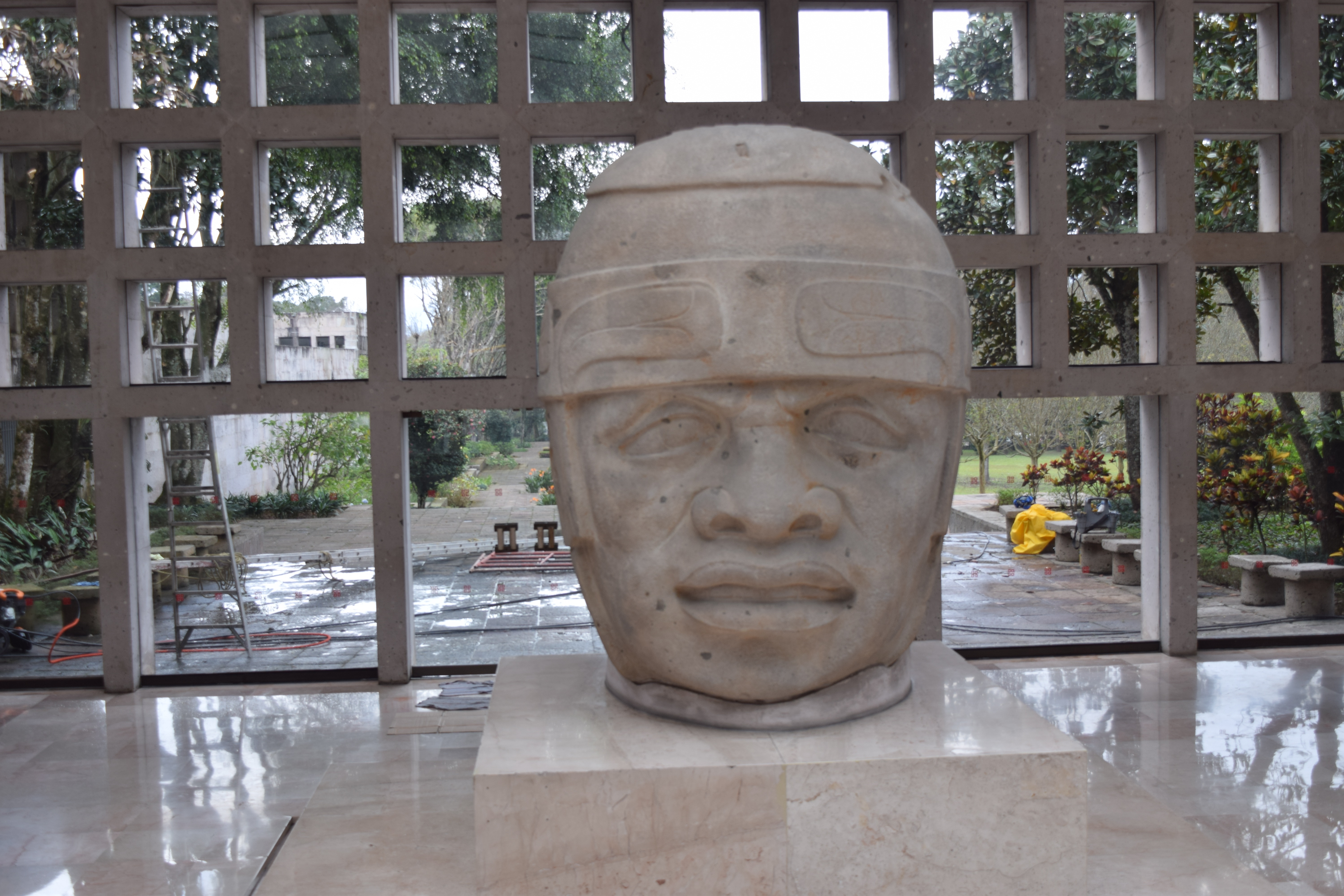
Colossal head; c.1050 BC; steatite; height: 2.2 m; Xalapa Museum of Anthropology (Xalapa, Mexico)

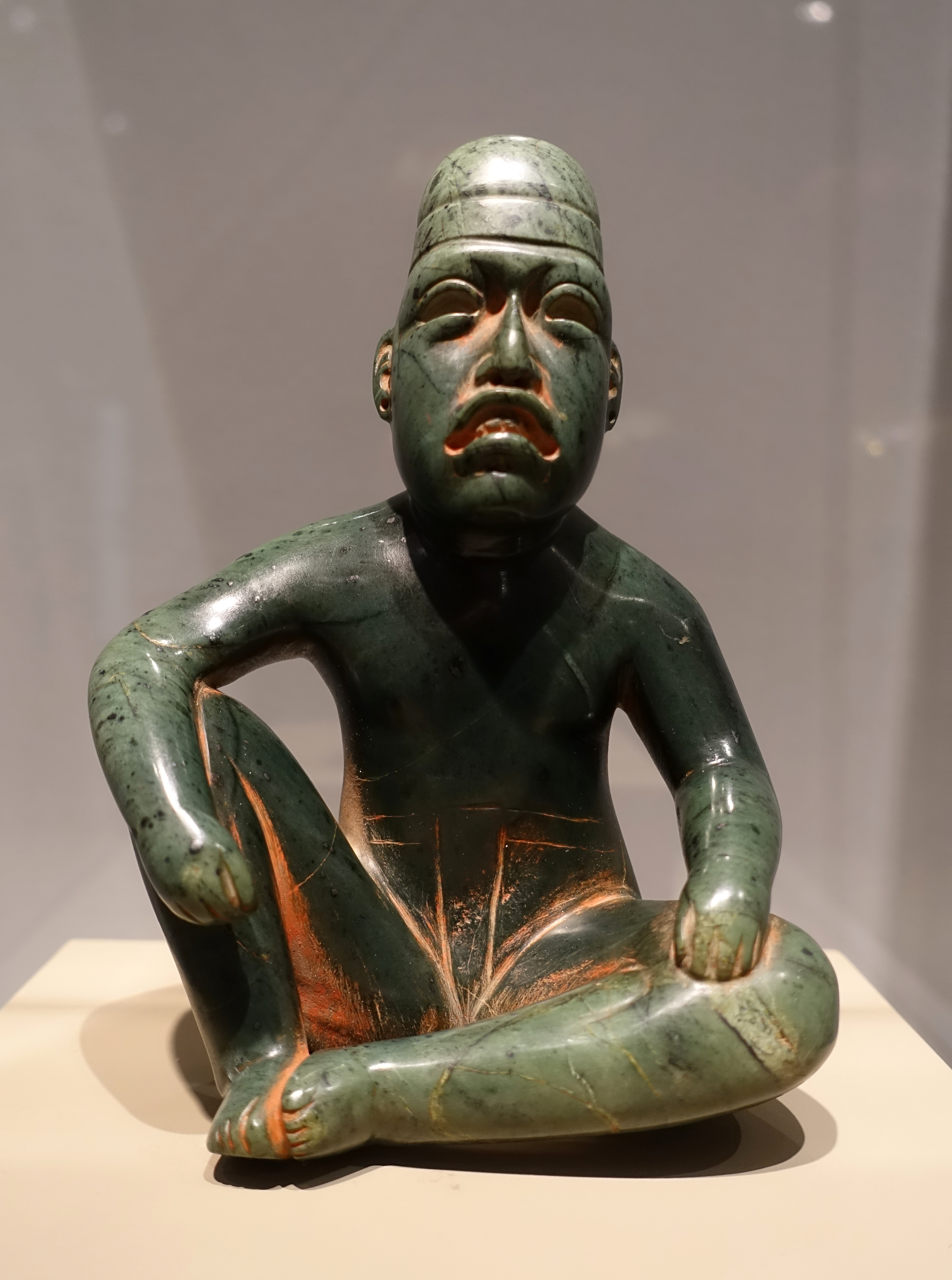
Seated shaman in ritual pose-shaped pendant (Olmec); 9th-5th century BC; serpentine and cinnabar; height: 18.5 cm; Dallas Museum of Art (Dallas, Texas, US)

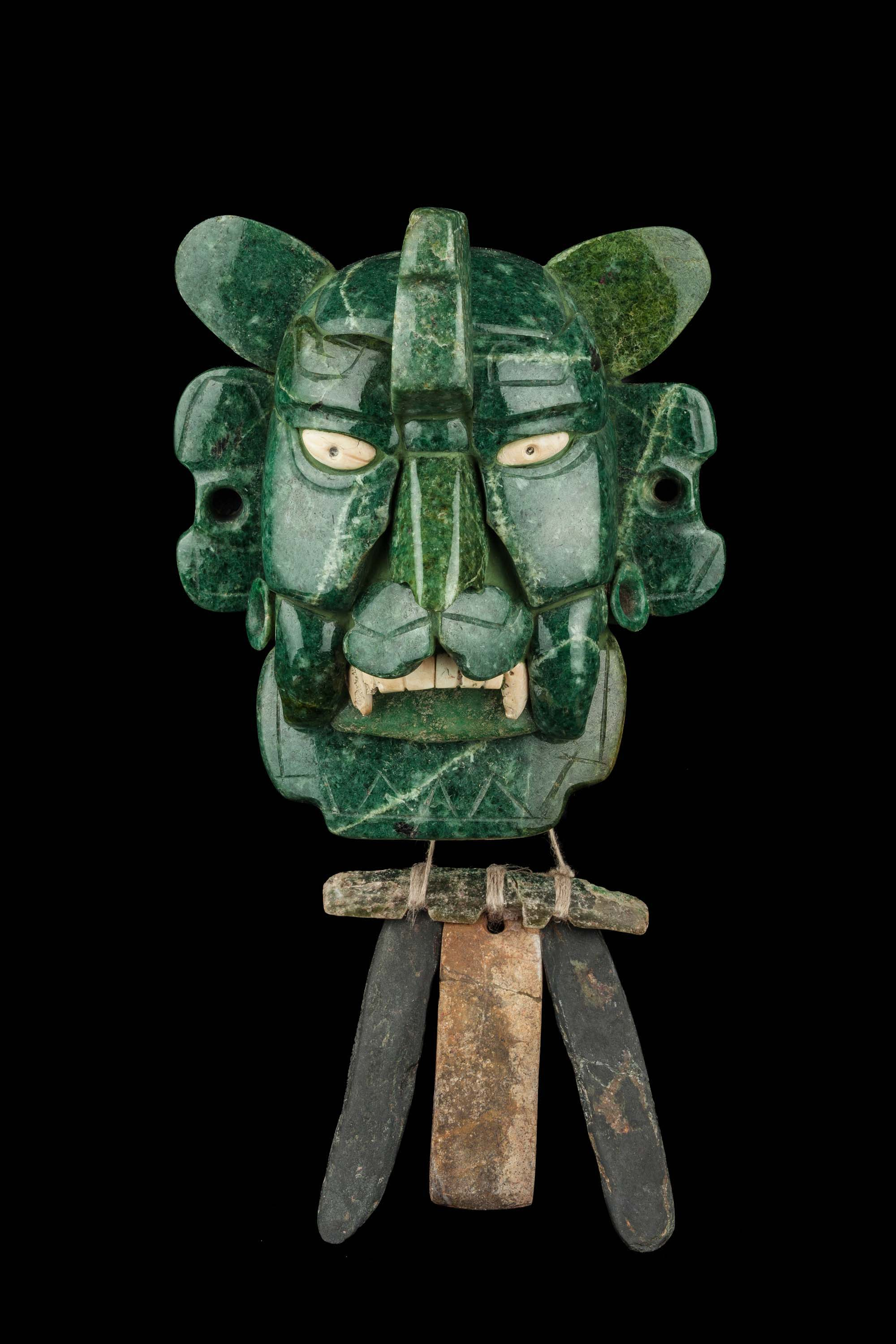
Bat effigy (Zapotec); c.50 BC; jadeite and shell; height: 28 cm; National Museum of Anthropology (Mexico City)

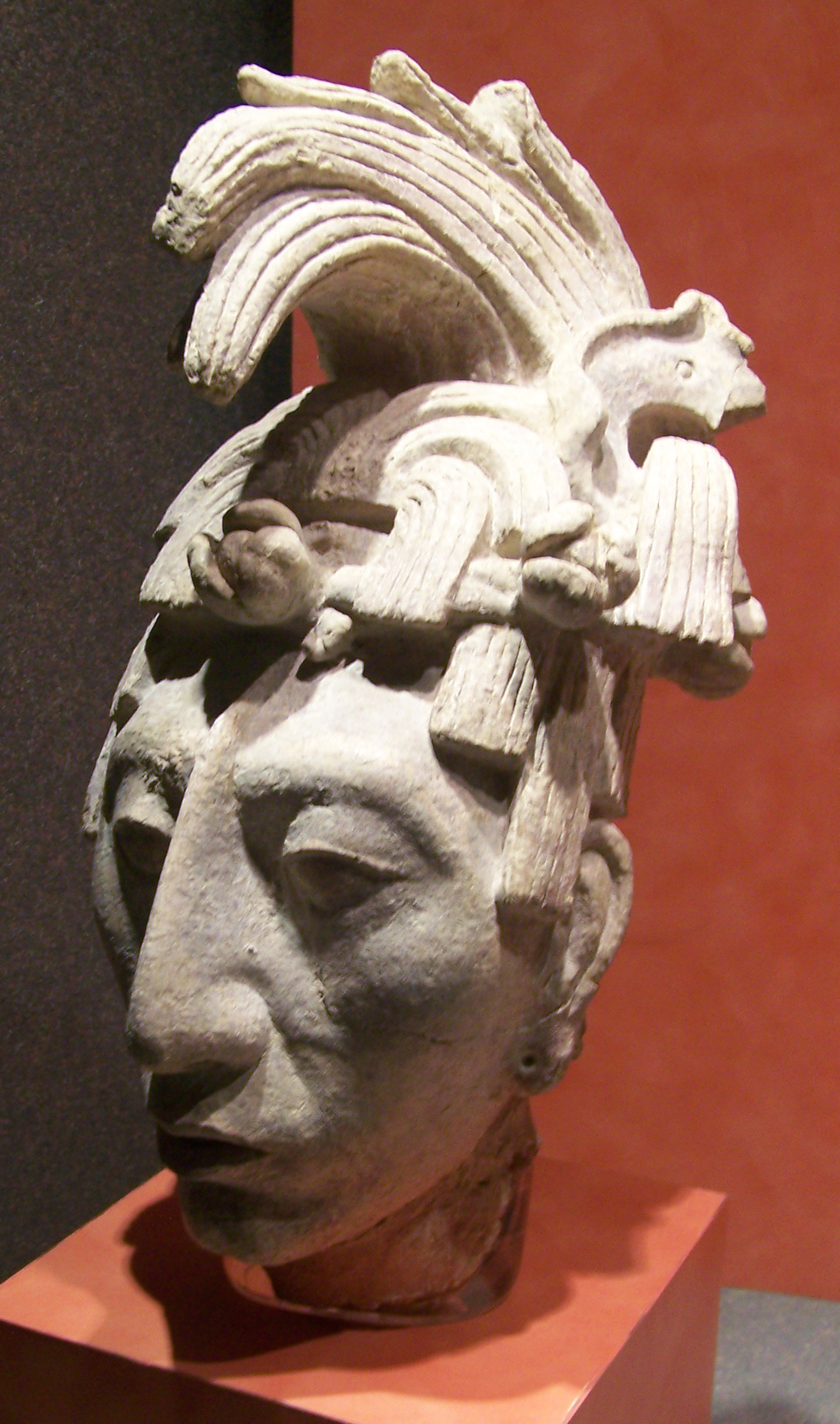
Portrait of K'inich Janaab Pakal I (Maya; 615–683; stucco; height 43 cm; National Museum of Anthropology

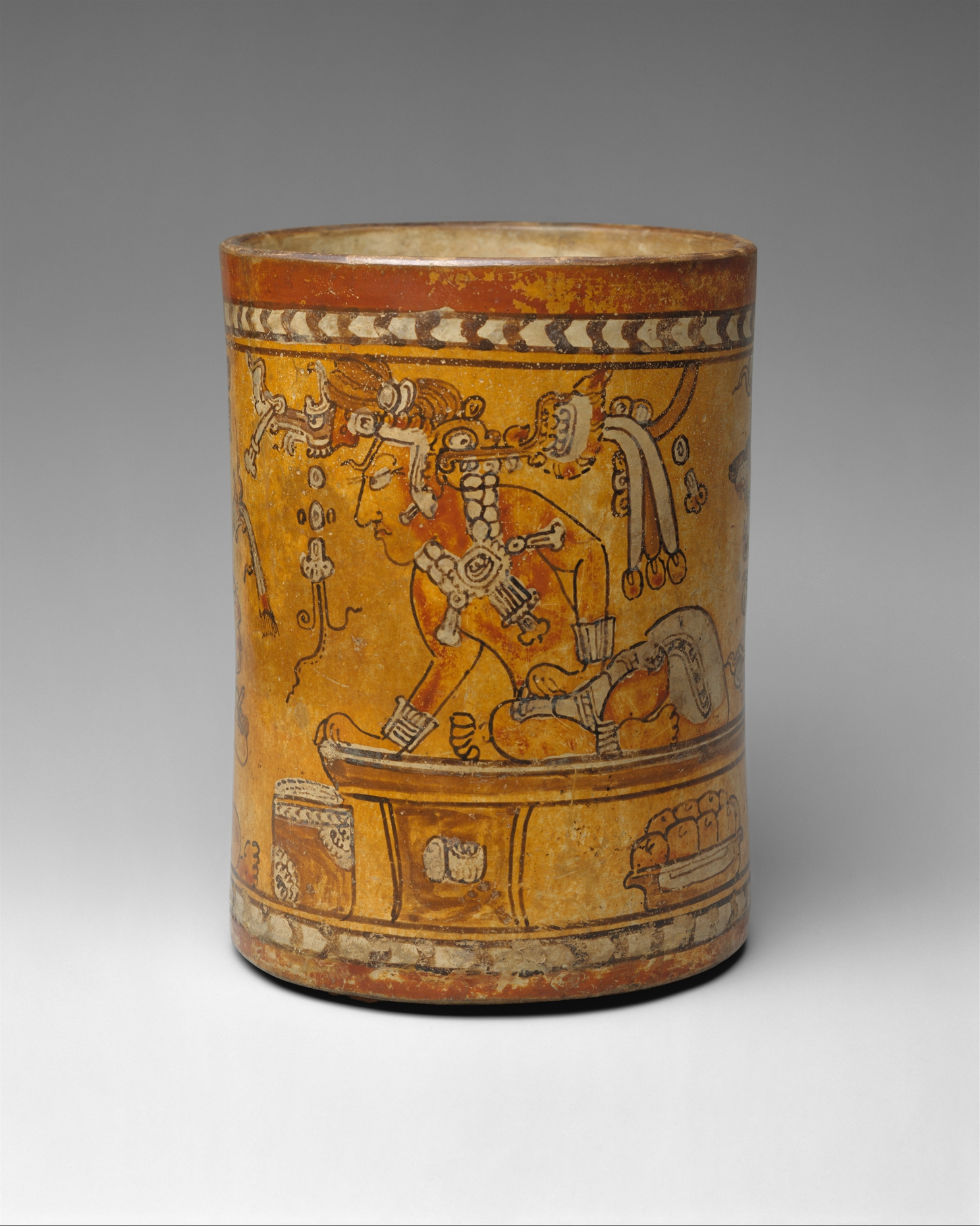
Vessel with a throne scene (Maya); late 7th–8th century; ceramic; 21.59 cm; Metropolitan Museum of Art (New York City)

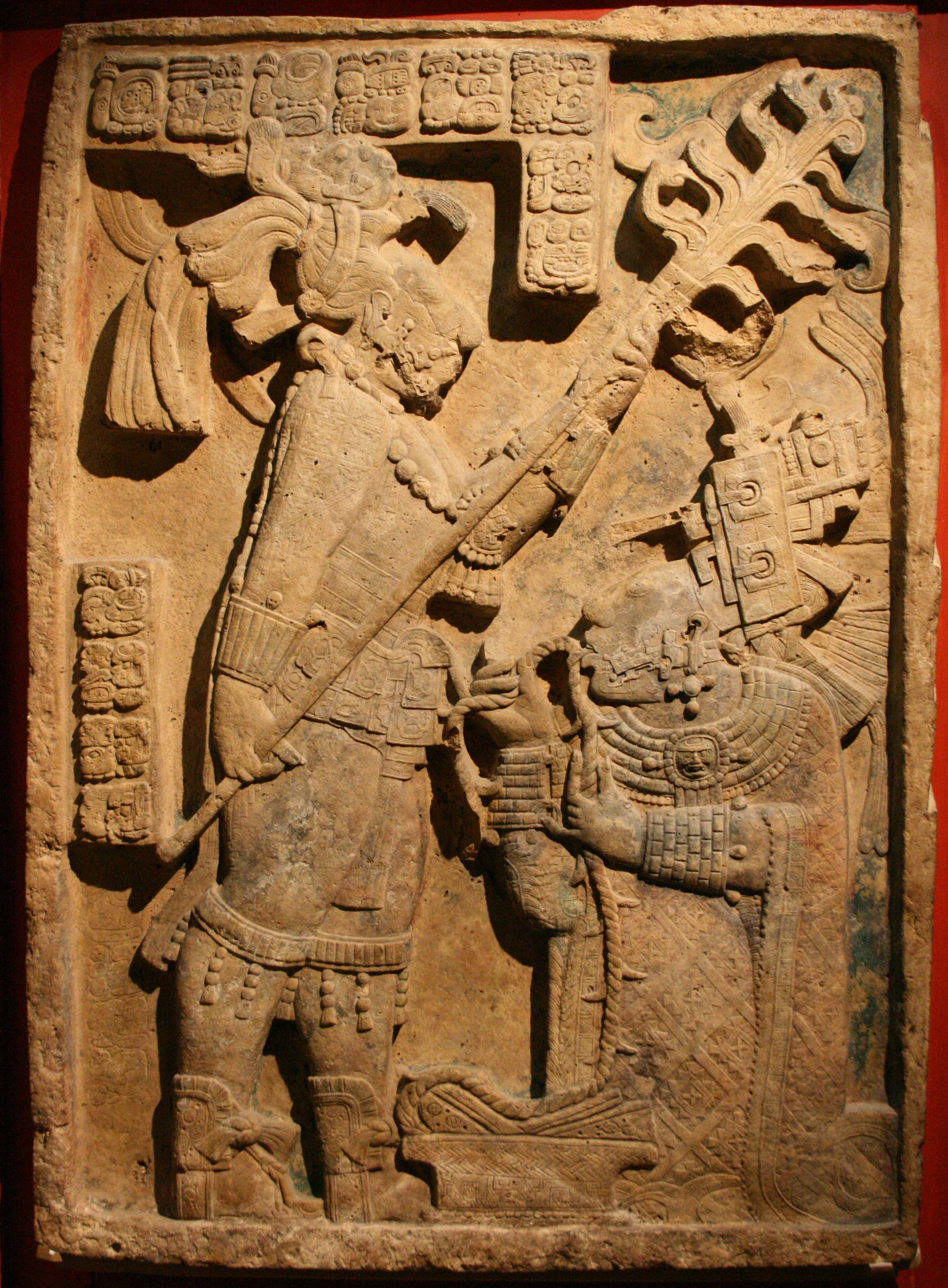
Yaxchilán Lintel 24 (Maya); 702; limestone; 109 x 74 cm; British Museum (London)

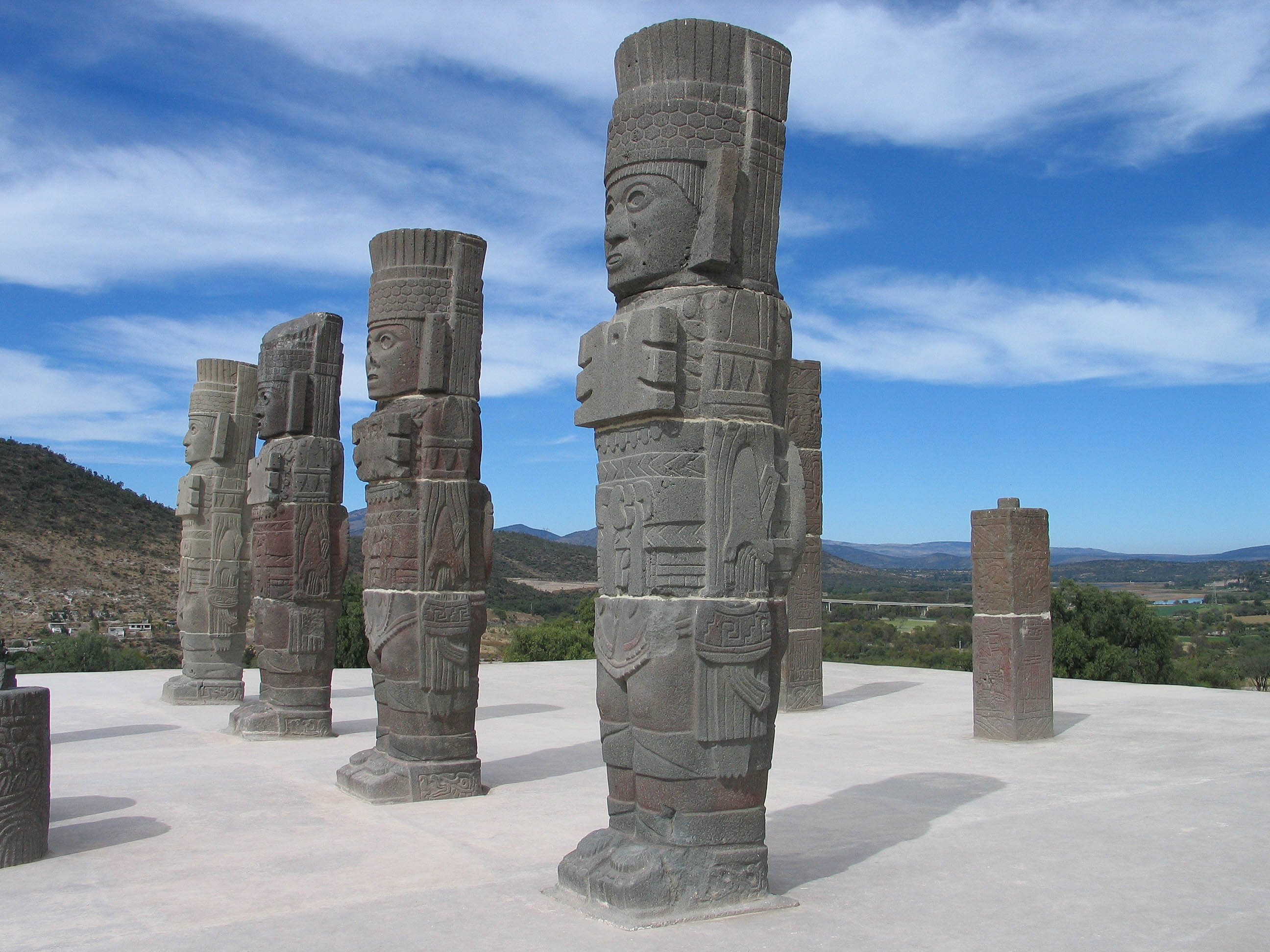
Warrior columns (Toltec); c.1000; basalt; height: c.460 cm; Tula de Allende (Mexico)

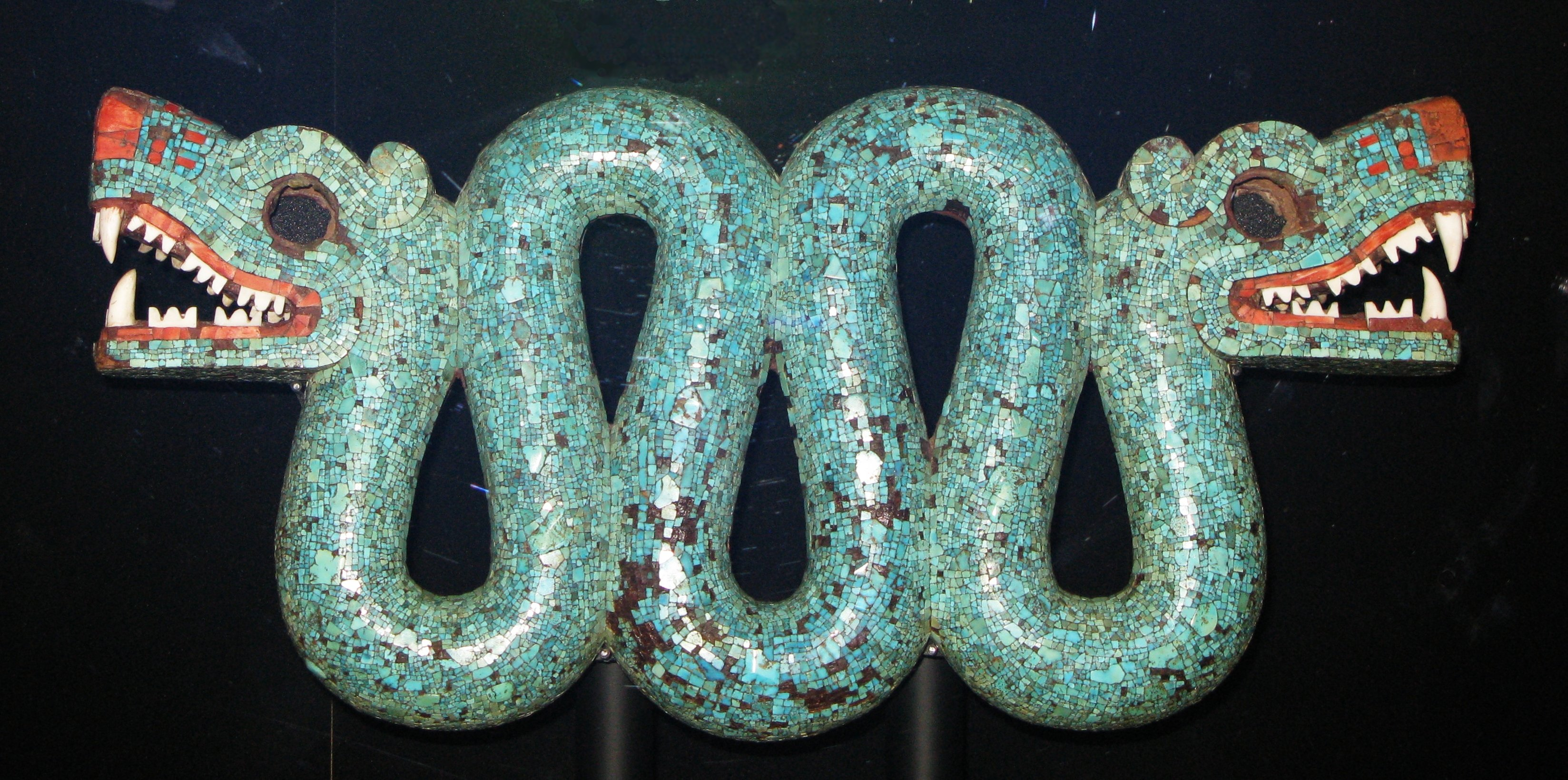
Double-headed serpent (Aztec); c. 1450–1521; cedar, turquoise, shell and traces of gilding; length: 43.3 cm; British Museum

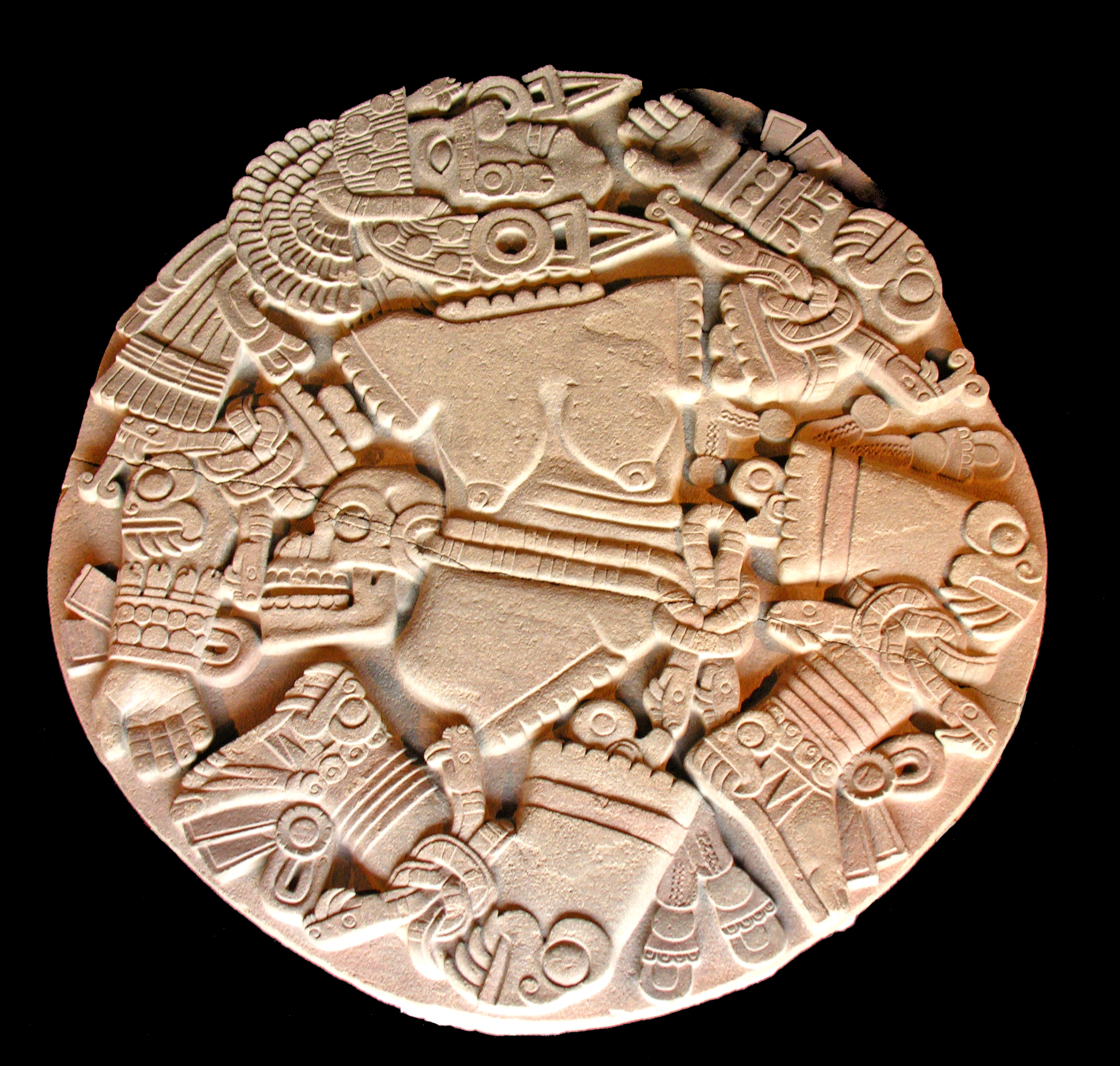
Coyolxauhqui Stone (Aztec); c. 1469–1481; stone; diameter: 3 m; Templo Mayor Museum (Mexico City)

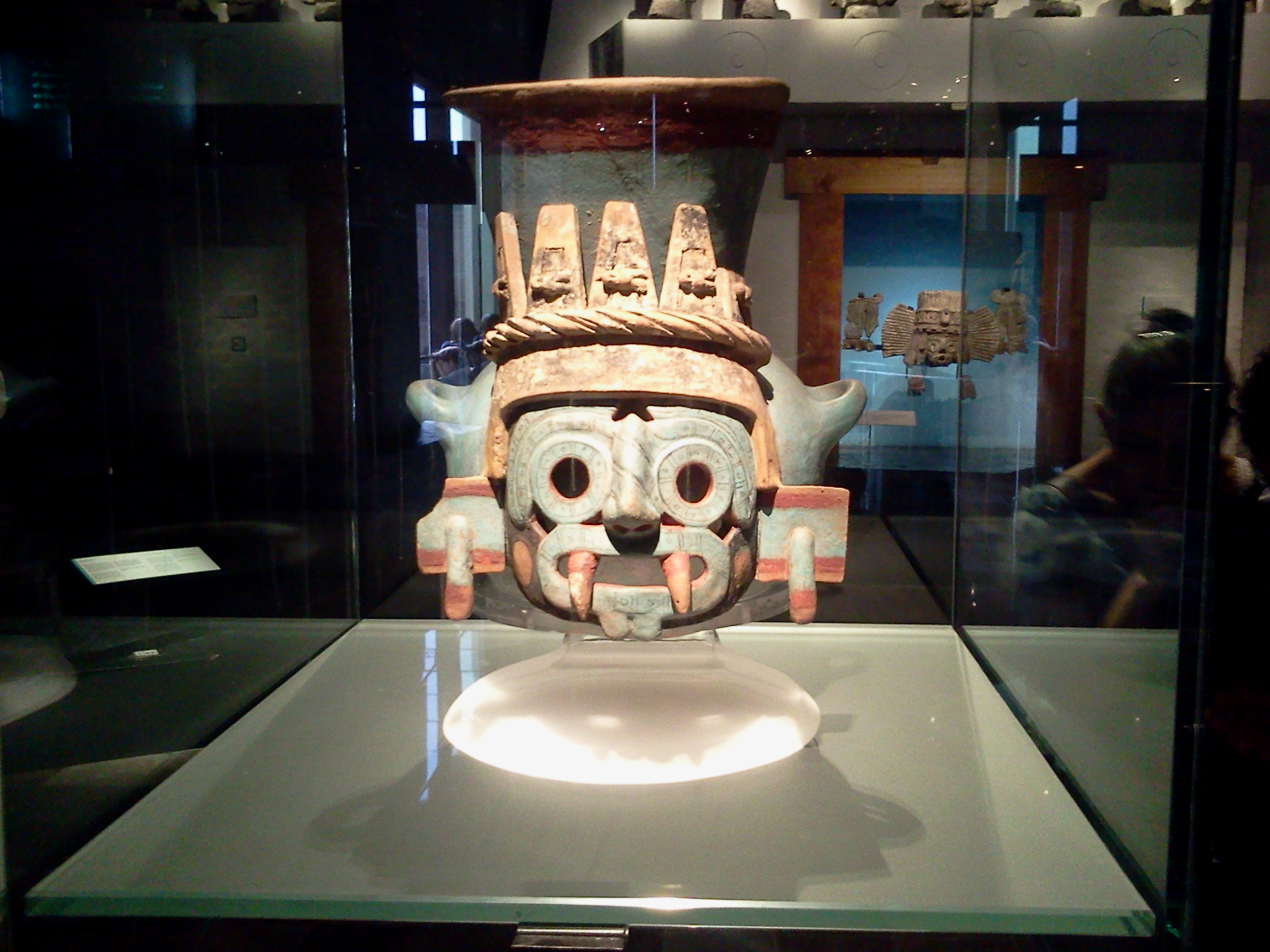
Tlāloc effigy vessel (Aztec); c. 1440–1469; painted earthenware; height: 35 cm; Templo Mayor Museum

=== Colombia ===
Similarly with Mesoamerica, the present-day territory of Colombia is an area where multiple cultures developed before the arrival of Spanish colonizers. Here, gold body accessories were produced, many golden ones, but also many other ones made of tumbaga, a non-specific alloy of gold and copper given by Spanish Conquistadors to metals composed of these elements found in widespread use in pre-Columbian Mesoamerica in North America and South America.

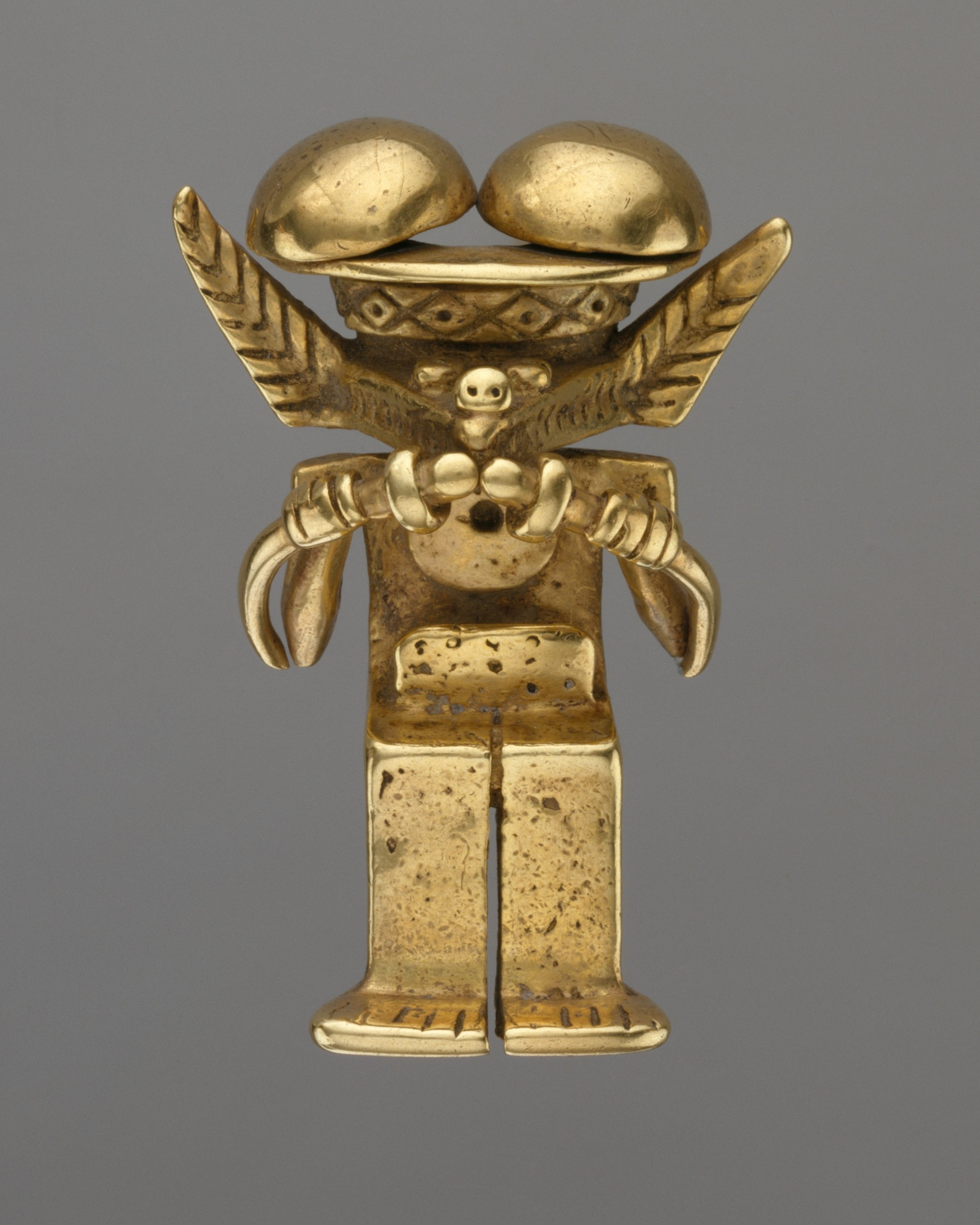
Animal-headed figure pendant (Yotoco); 1st–7th century; gold; height: 6.35 cm; Metropolitan Museum of Art (New York City)

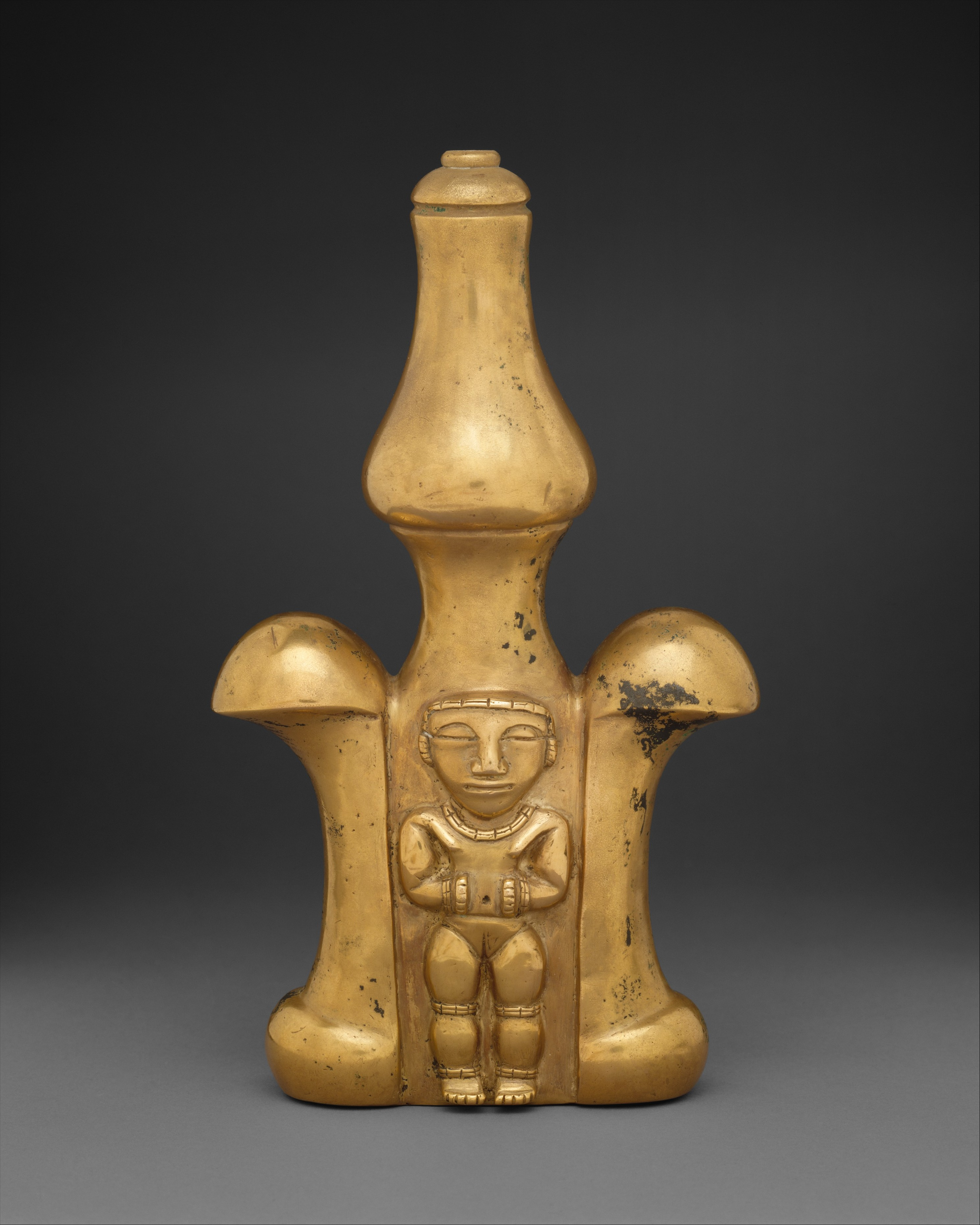
Lime container (Quimbaya); 5th–9th century; gold; height: 23 cm; Metropolitan Museum of Art

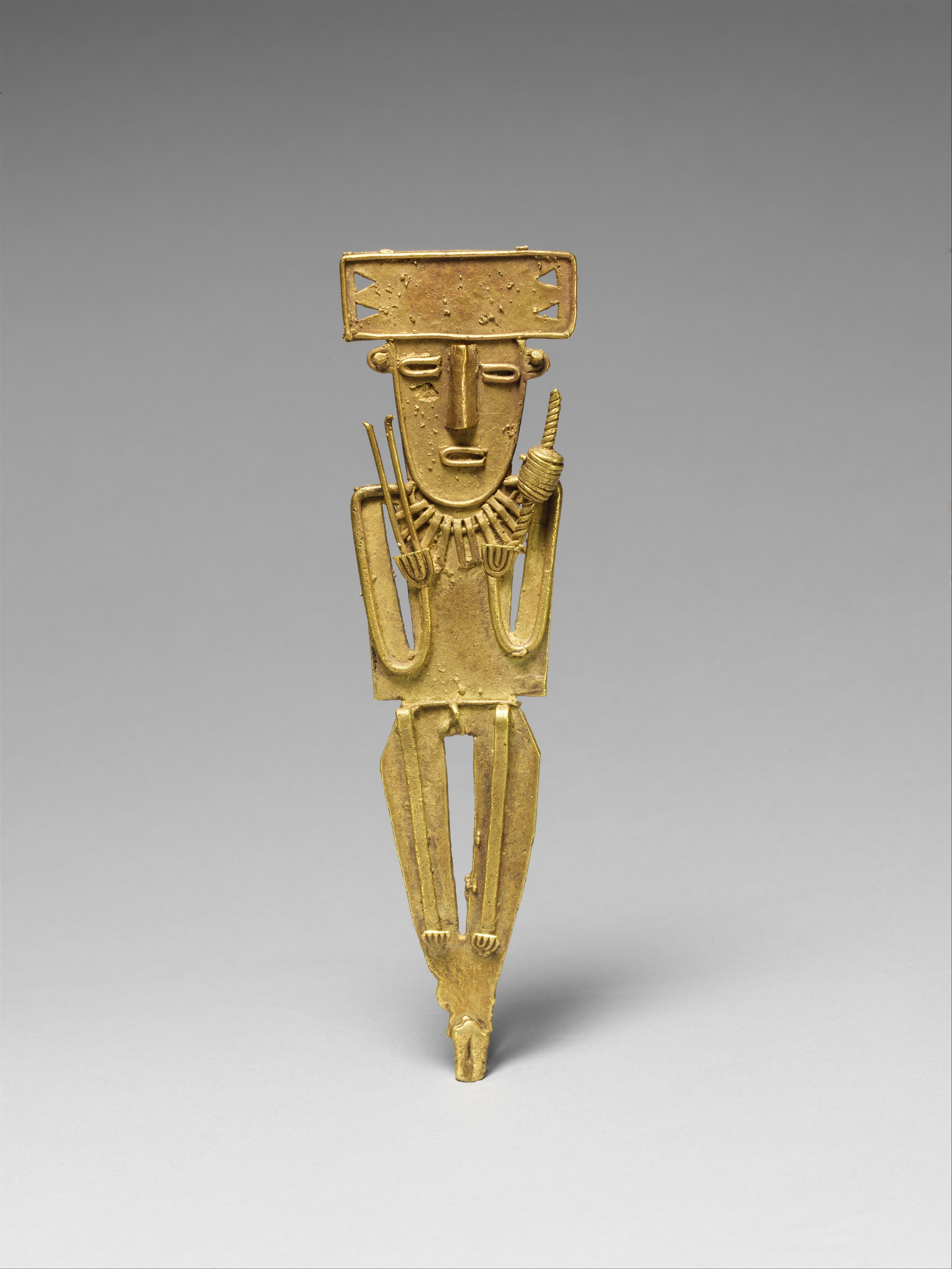
Male figure/tunjo (Muisca); 10th–mid-16th century; gold; height: 14.9 cm; Metropolitan Museum of Art

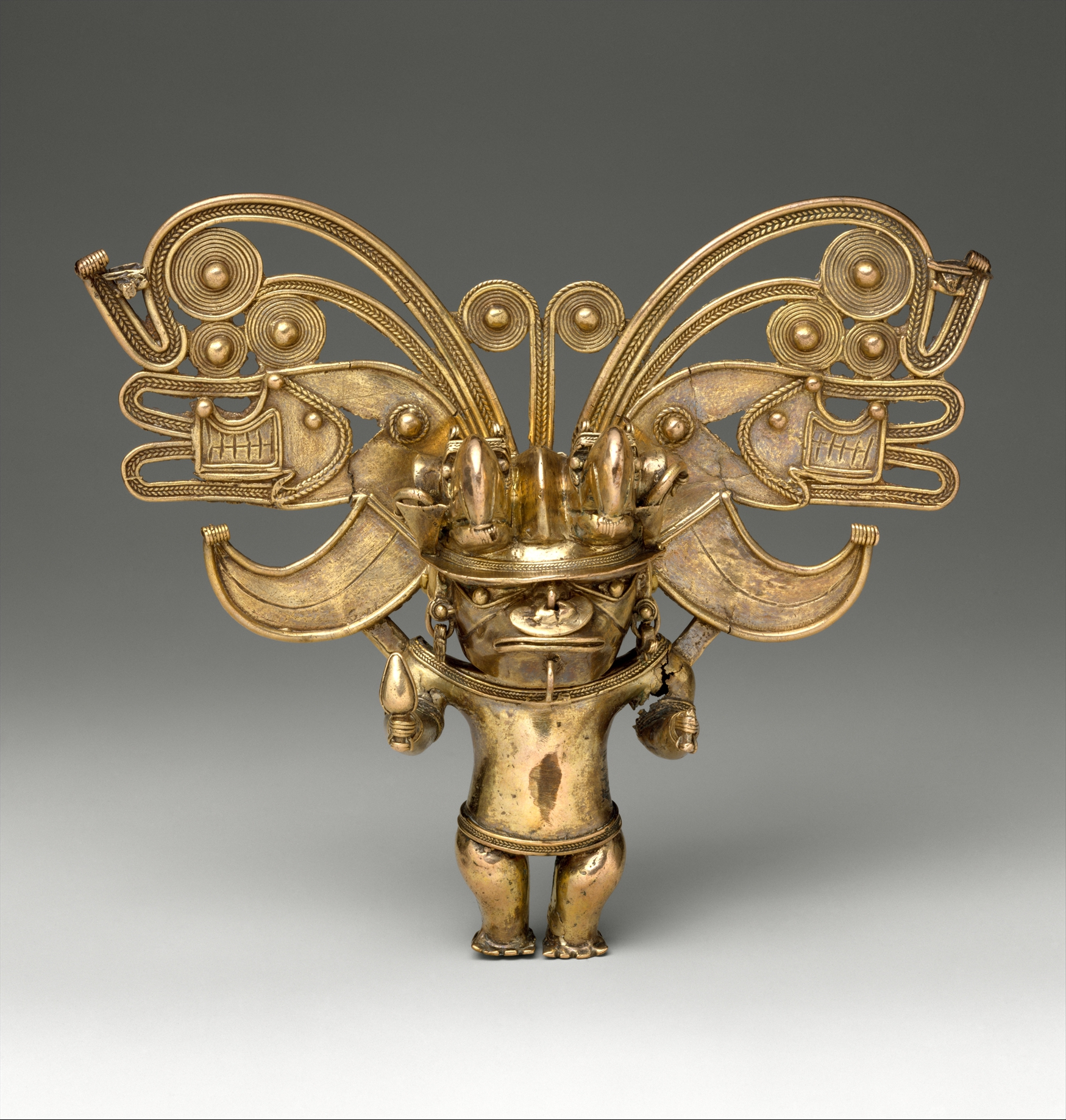
Pendant (Tairona); 10th–16th century; gold; height: 14 cm; Metropolitan Museum of Art

=== Andean Regions ===
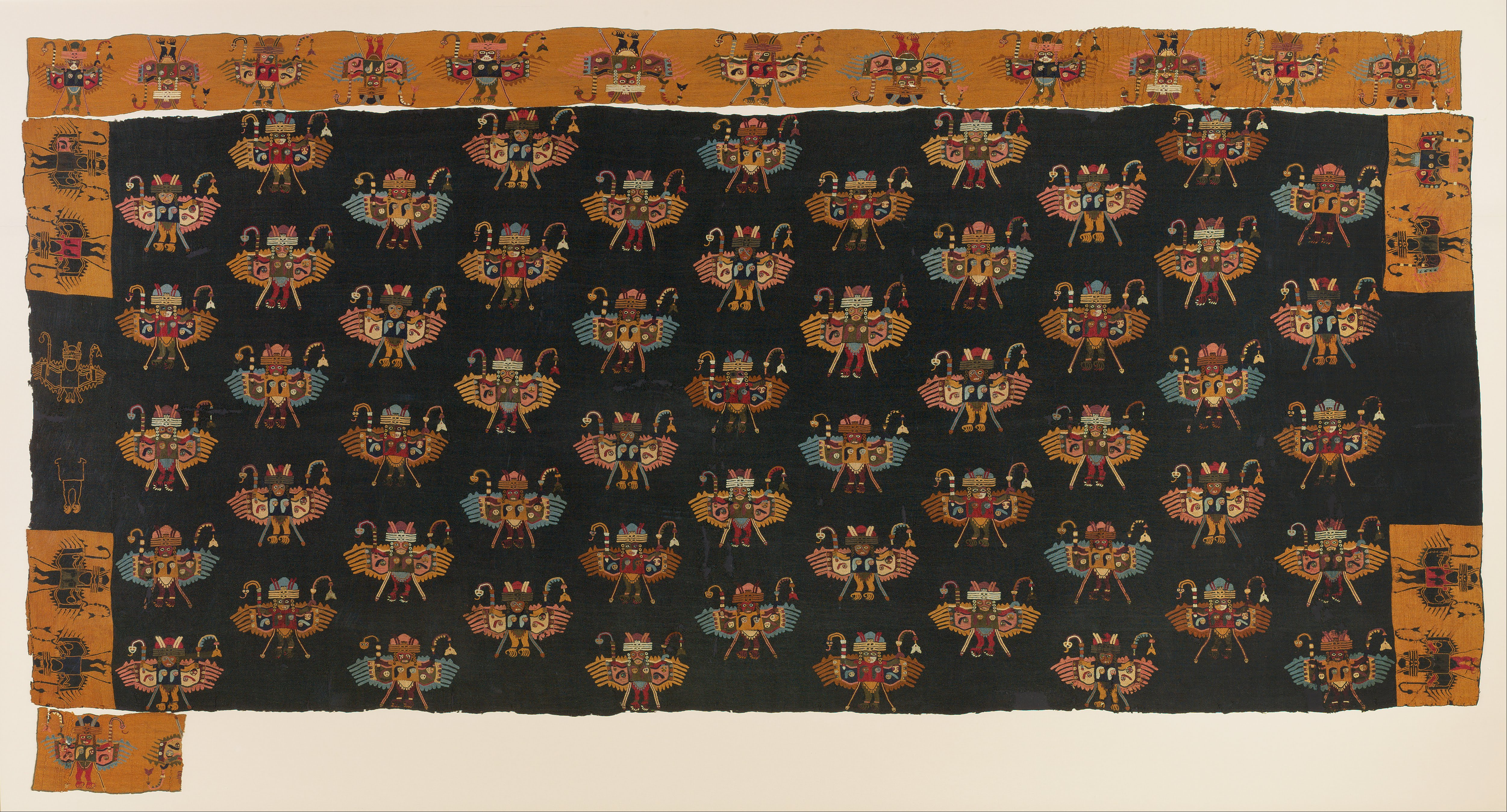
Mantle (Paracas); 50–100 AD; embroidered wool; height: 1.01 m; Museum of Fine Arts (Boston, US)

The ancient civilizations of Peru and Bolivia nurtured unique artistic traditions, including one of the world's most aesthetically impressive fibre art traditions. Two of the first important cultures from this land are the Chavín and the Paracas culture.

The Paracas culture of the south coast of Peru is best known for its complex patterned textiles, particularly mantels. The Moche controlled the river valleys of the north coast, while the Nazca of southern Peru held sway along the coastal deserts and contiguous mountains. The Nazca are best known for the famous Nazca Lines, a group of geoglyphs in a desert in southern Peru. They also produced polychrome ceramics and textiles influenced by the Paracas, and used a palette of at least 10 colours for their pottery. Both cultures flourished around 100–800 AD. Moche pottery is some of the most varied in the world. In the north, the Wari (or Huari) Empire are noted for their stone architecture and sculpture accomplishments.

The Chimú were preceded by a simple ceramic style known as Sicán (700–900 AD). The Chimú produced excellent portrait and decorative works in metal, notably gold but especially silver. Later, the Inca Empire (1100–1533) stretched across the Andes Mountains. They crafted precious metal figurines, and like other civilizations from the same area, complex textiles. Llamas were important animals, because of their wool and for carrying loads.

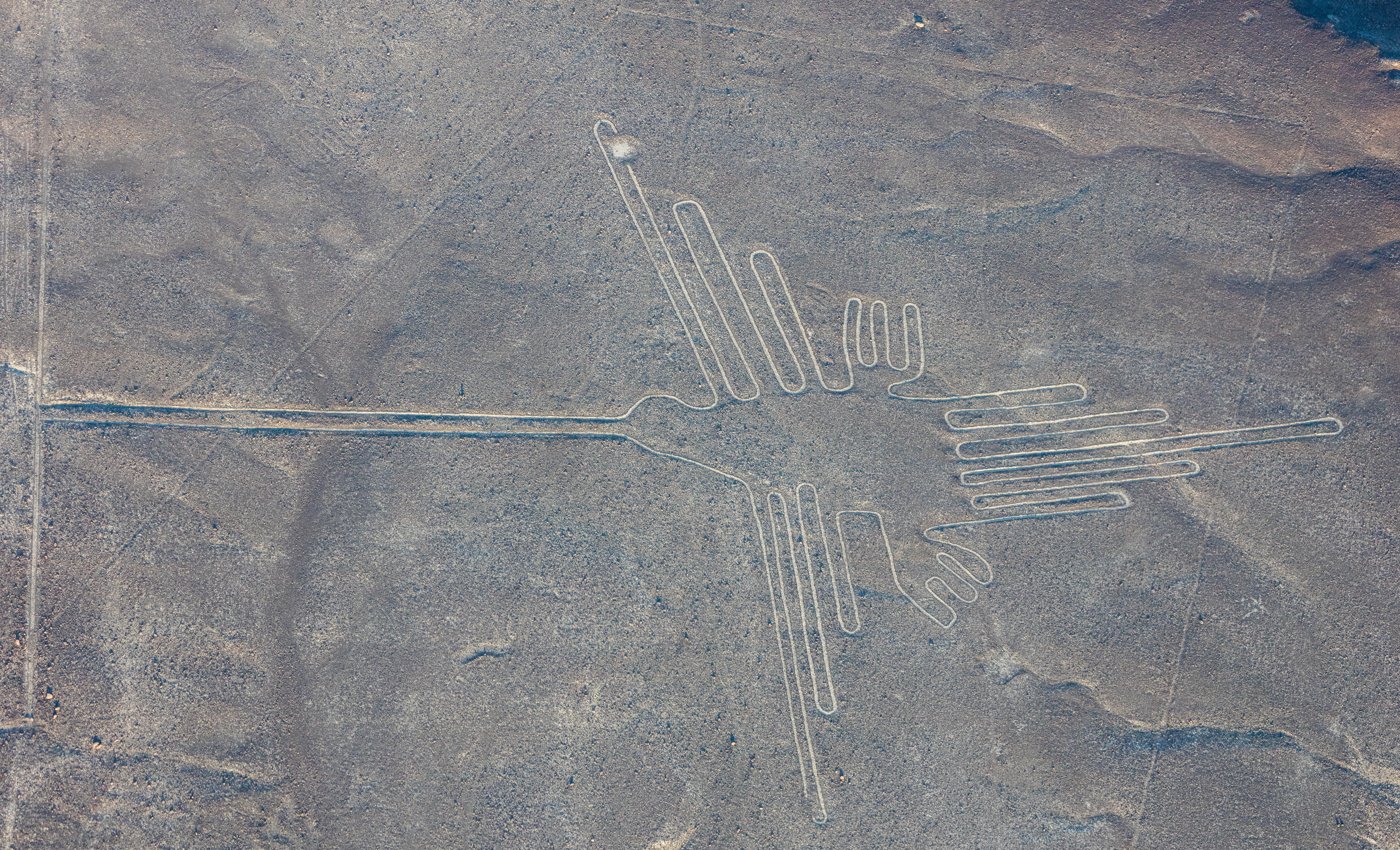
The Hummingbird, one of the Nazca Lines (Nazca); c.200 BC-600 AD; rocks, gravel and dirt; length: 50 m; Nasca and Palpa Provinces (Peru)

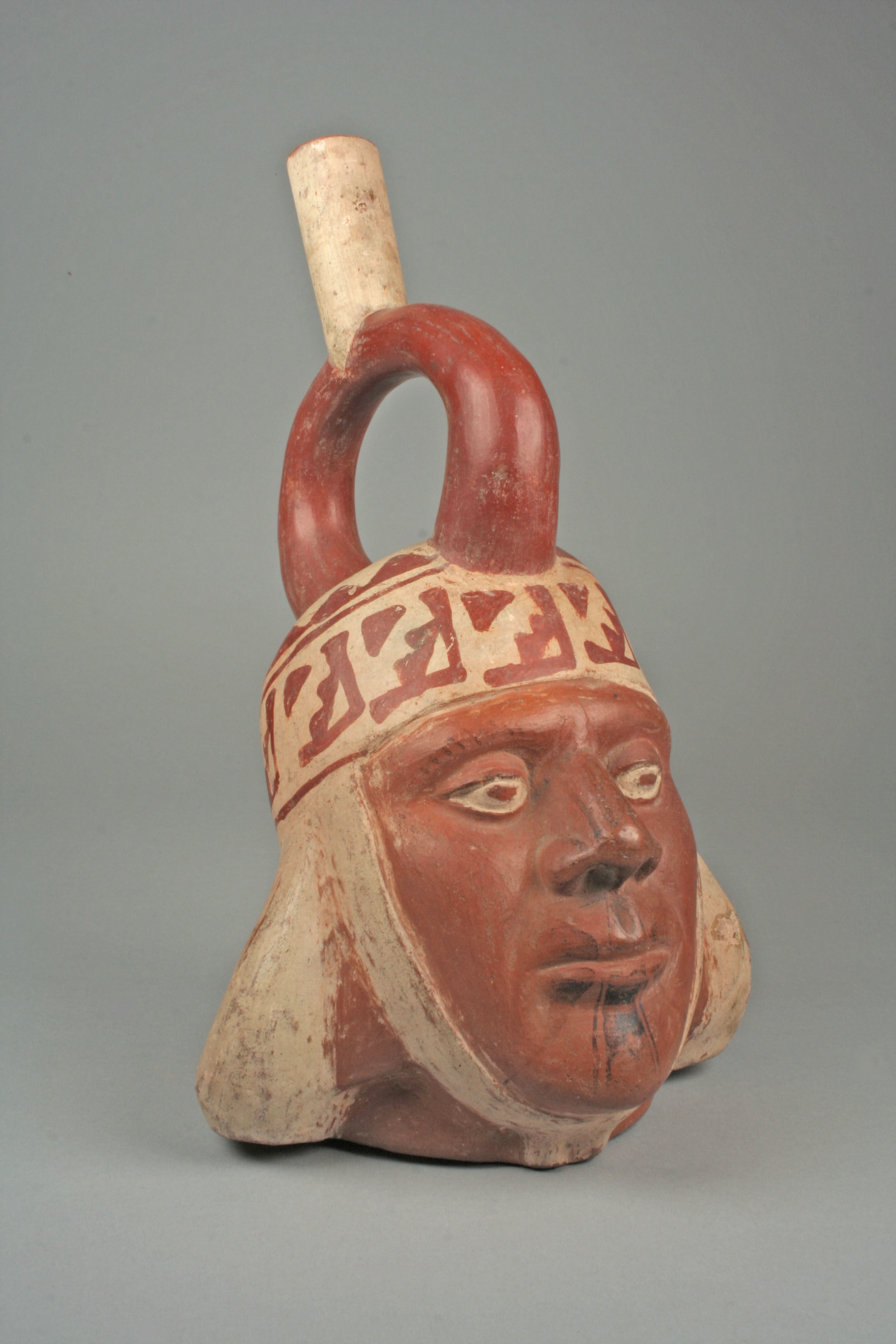
Portrait head bottle (Moche); 3rd–6th century; painted ceramic; overall: 26.35 x 16.21 cm; Metropolitan Museum of Art (New York City)

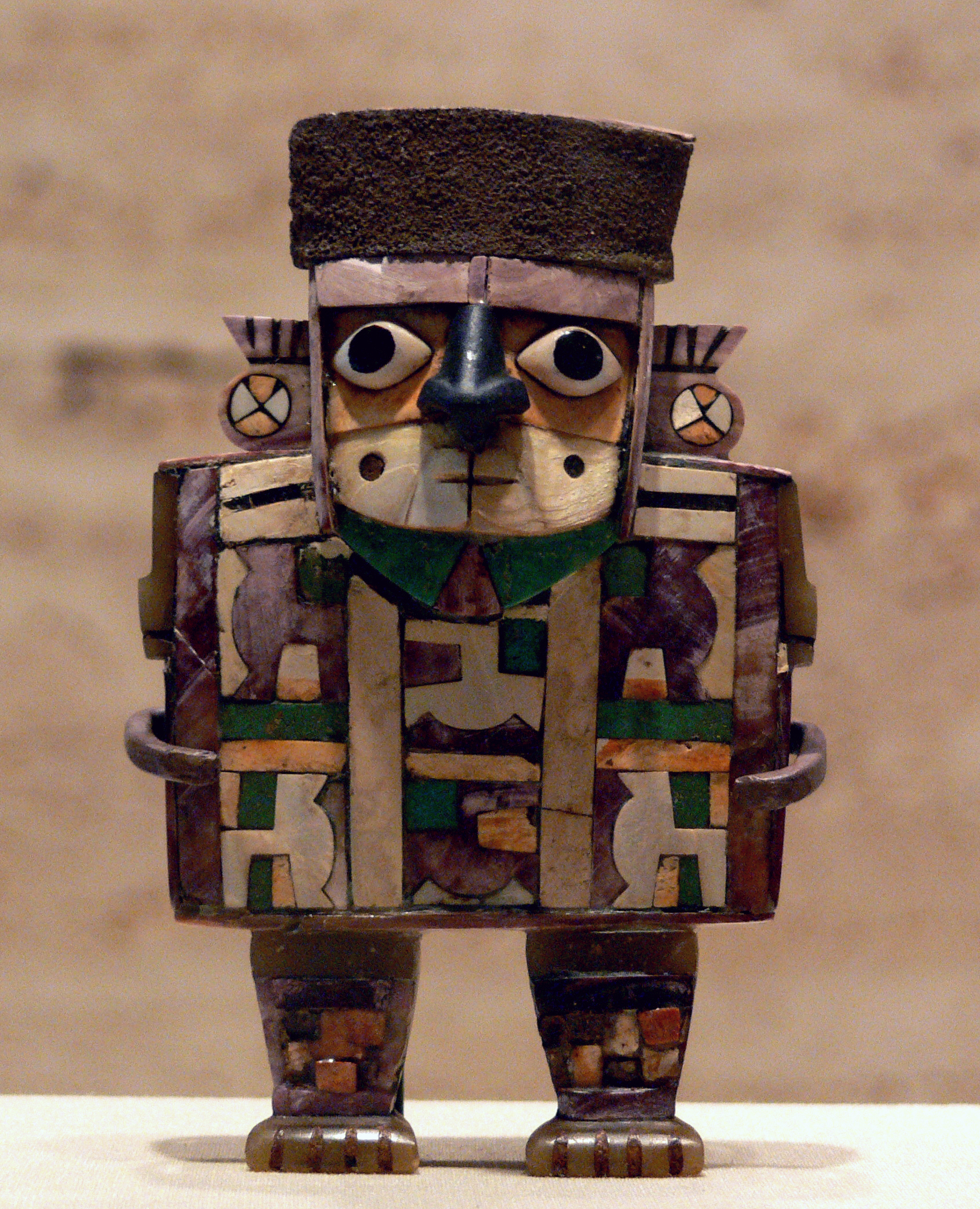
Mosaic figurine of a noble man (Wari); 7th-9th century; wood, shell, stone and silver; height: 10.2 cm; Kimbell Art Museum (Fort Worth, Texas, US)

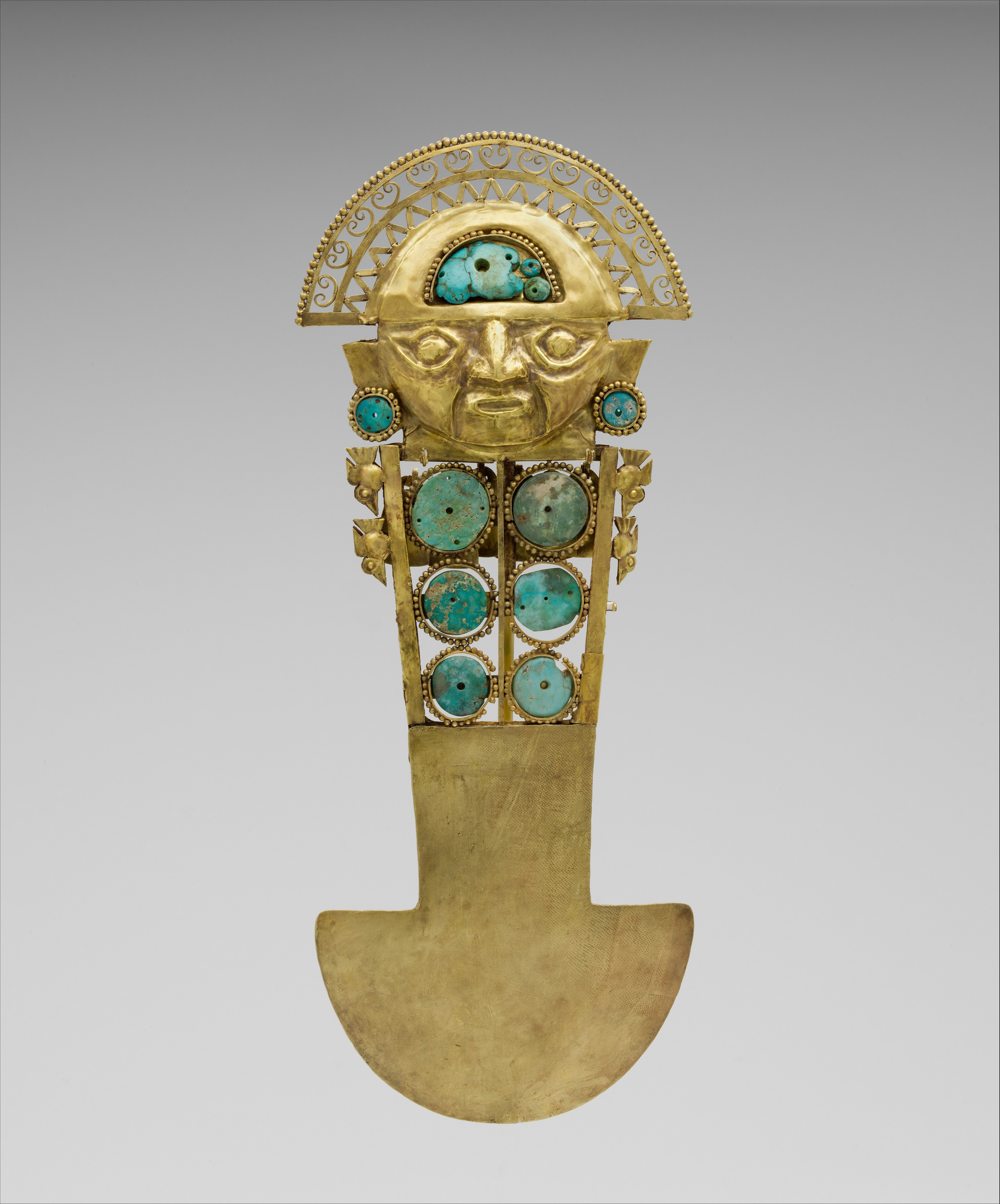
Ceremonial knife/tumi (Sican); 10th–13th century; gold, turquoise, greenstone and shell; height: 33 cm; Metropolitan Museum of Art

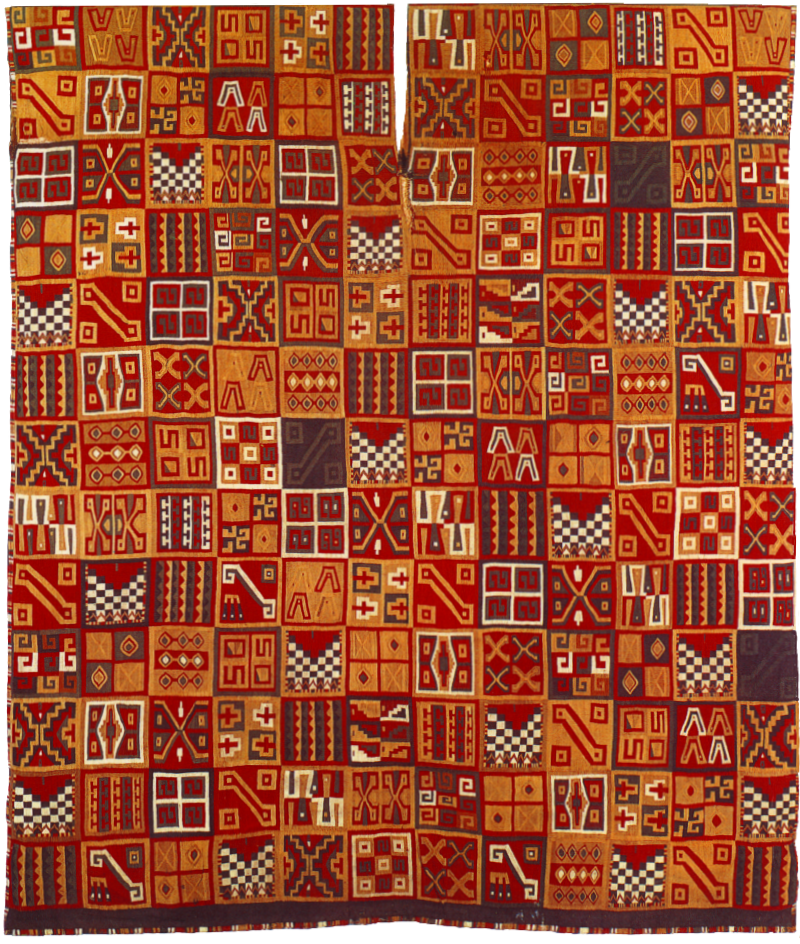
Royal tunic (Inca); 1476–1534; camelid fibre and cotton; height: 91 cm; Dumbarton Oaks (Washington, D.C., US)

== Asian ==
Eastern civilization broadly includes Asia, and it also includes a complex tradition of art making. One approach to Eastern art history divides the field by nation, with foci on Indian art, Chinese art, and Japanese art. Due to the size of the continent, the distinction between Eastern Asia and Southern Asia in the context of arts can be clearly seen. In most of Asia, pottery was a prevalent form of art. The pottery is often decorated with geometric patterns or abstract representations of animals, people or plants. Other very widespread forms of art were, and are, sculpture and painting.

=== Central Asia ===
Central Asian art developed in Central Asia, in areas corresponding to modern Kyrgyzstan, Kazakhstan, Uzbekistan, Turkmenistan, Azerbaijan, Tajikistan, Afghanistan, Pakistan, and parts of modern Mongolia, China and Russia. The art of ancient and medieval Central Asia reflects the rich history of this vast area, home to a huge variety of peoples, religions and ways of life. The artistic remains of the region show a remarkable combinations of influences that exemplify the multicultural nature of Central Asian society. The Silk Road transmission of art, Scythian art, Greco-Buddhist art, Serindian art and more recently Persianate culture, are all part of this complicated history. Central Asia has always been a crossroads of cultural exchange, the hub of the so-called Silk Road – that complex system of trade routes stretching from China to the Mediterranean. Already in the Bronze Age (3rd and 2nd millennium BC), growing settlements formed part of an extensive network of trade linking Central Asia to the Indus Valley, Mesopotamia and Egypt.

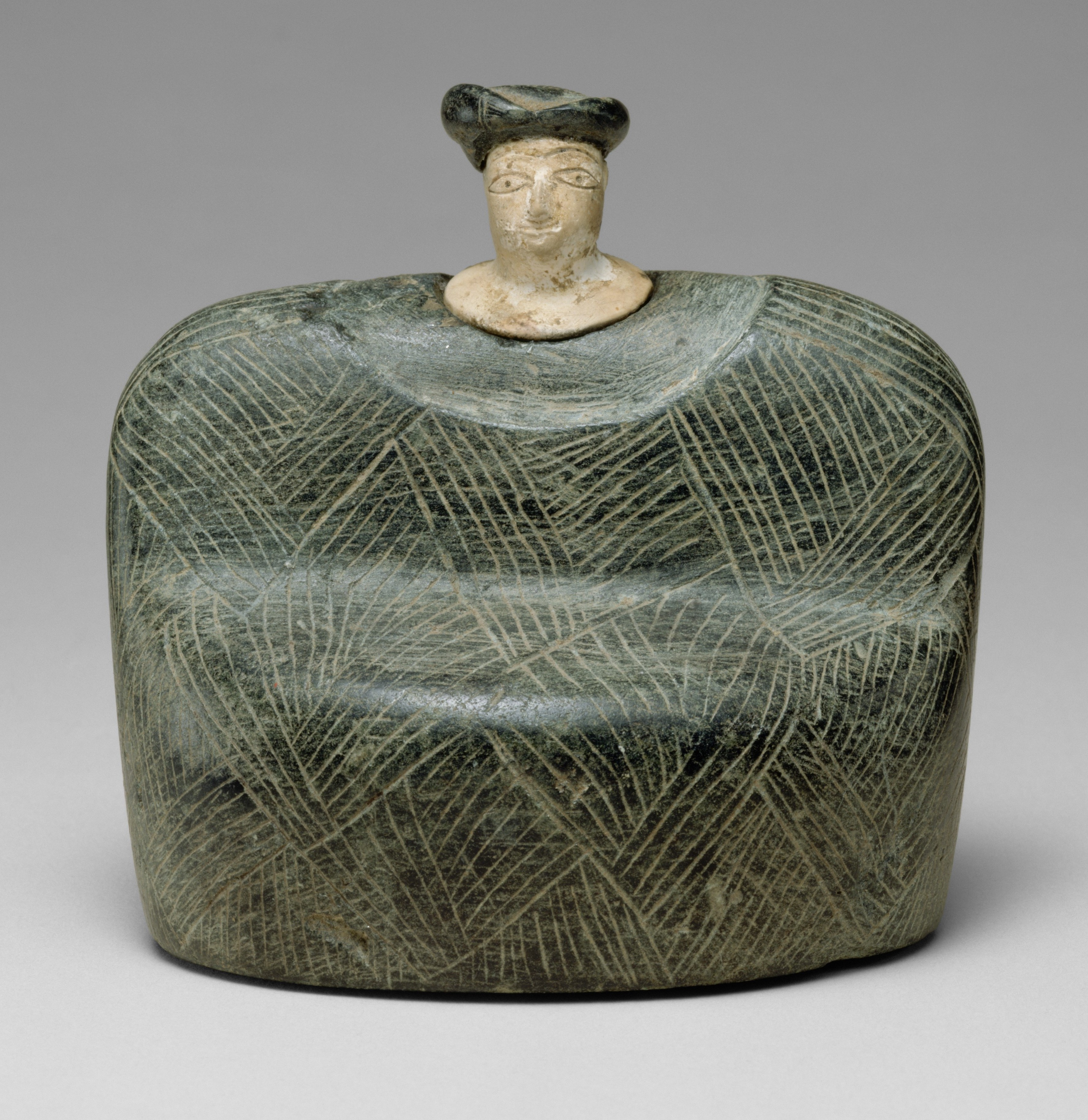
Seated figurine (Bactrian); 3rd-2nd millennia BC; chlorite and limestone; height: 9 cm; Metropolitan Museum of Art (New York City)

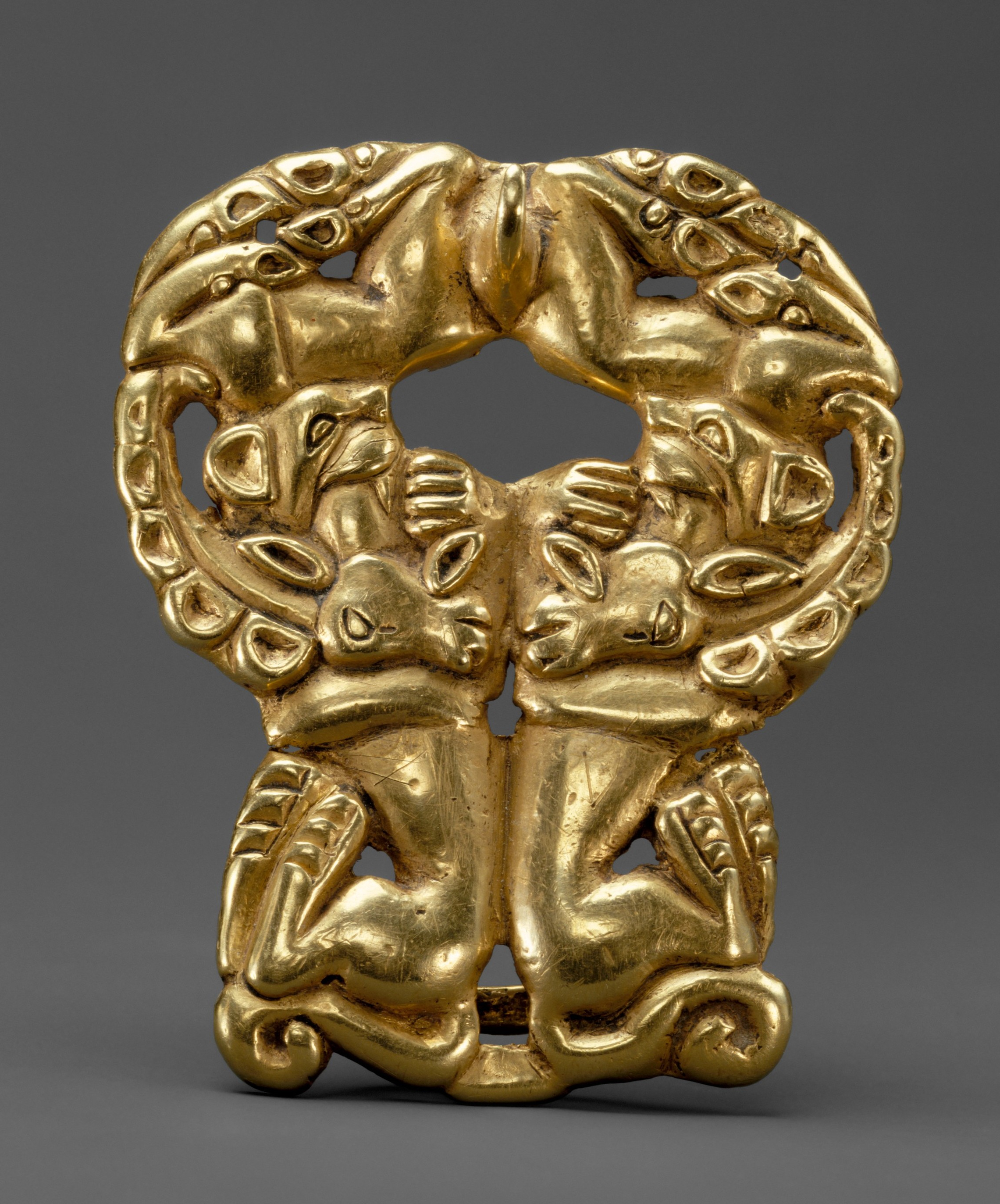
Belt buckle; 3rd-1st centuries BC; gold; height: 7.9 cm; Metropolitan Museum of Art

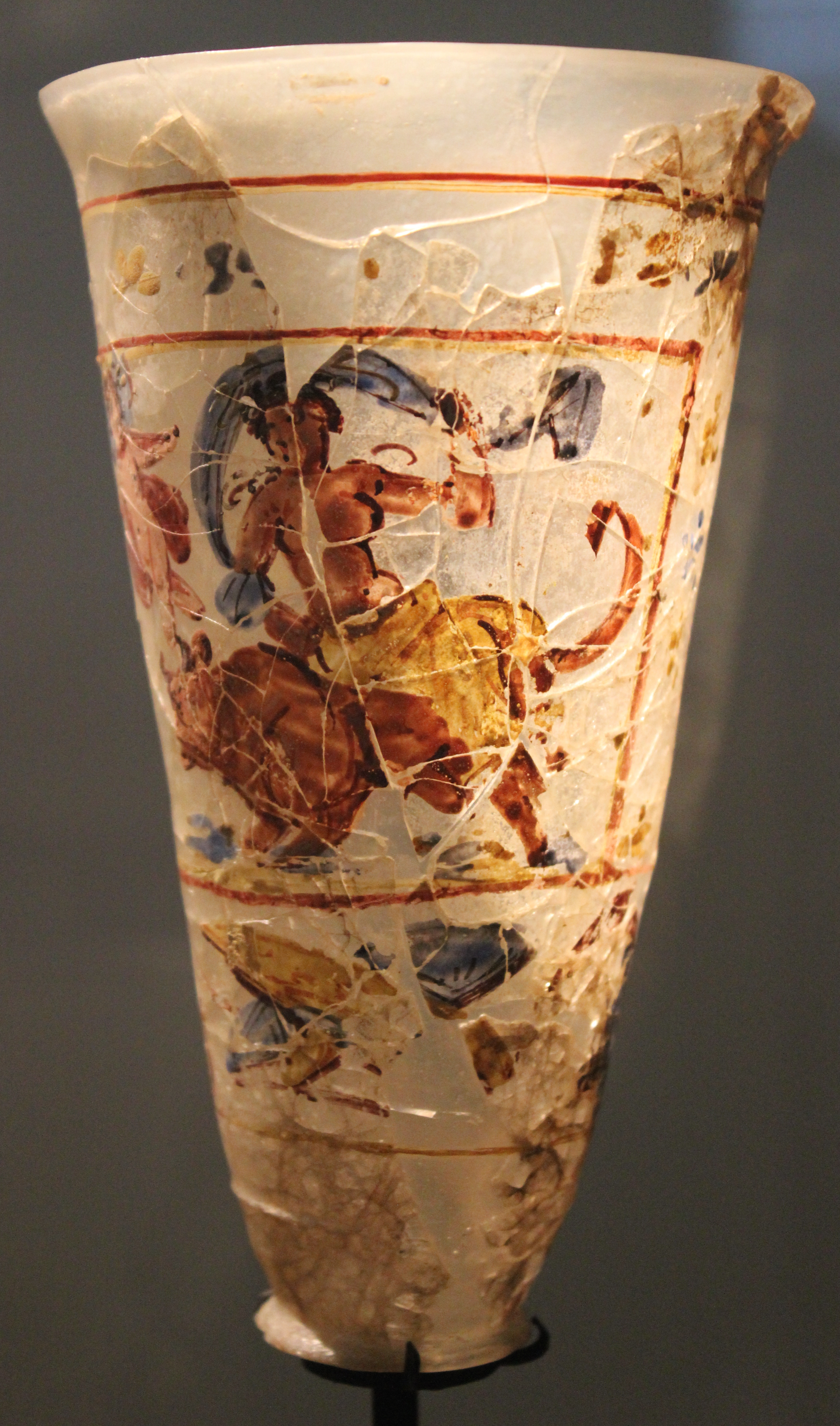
Goblet showing The Rape of Europa and of Ganymede, part of the Bagram Treasure; 1st century AD; painted glass; height: 16 cm, diameter: 10 cm; Guimet Museum (Paris)

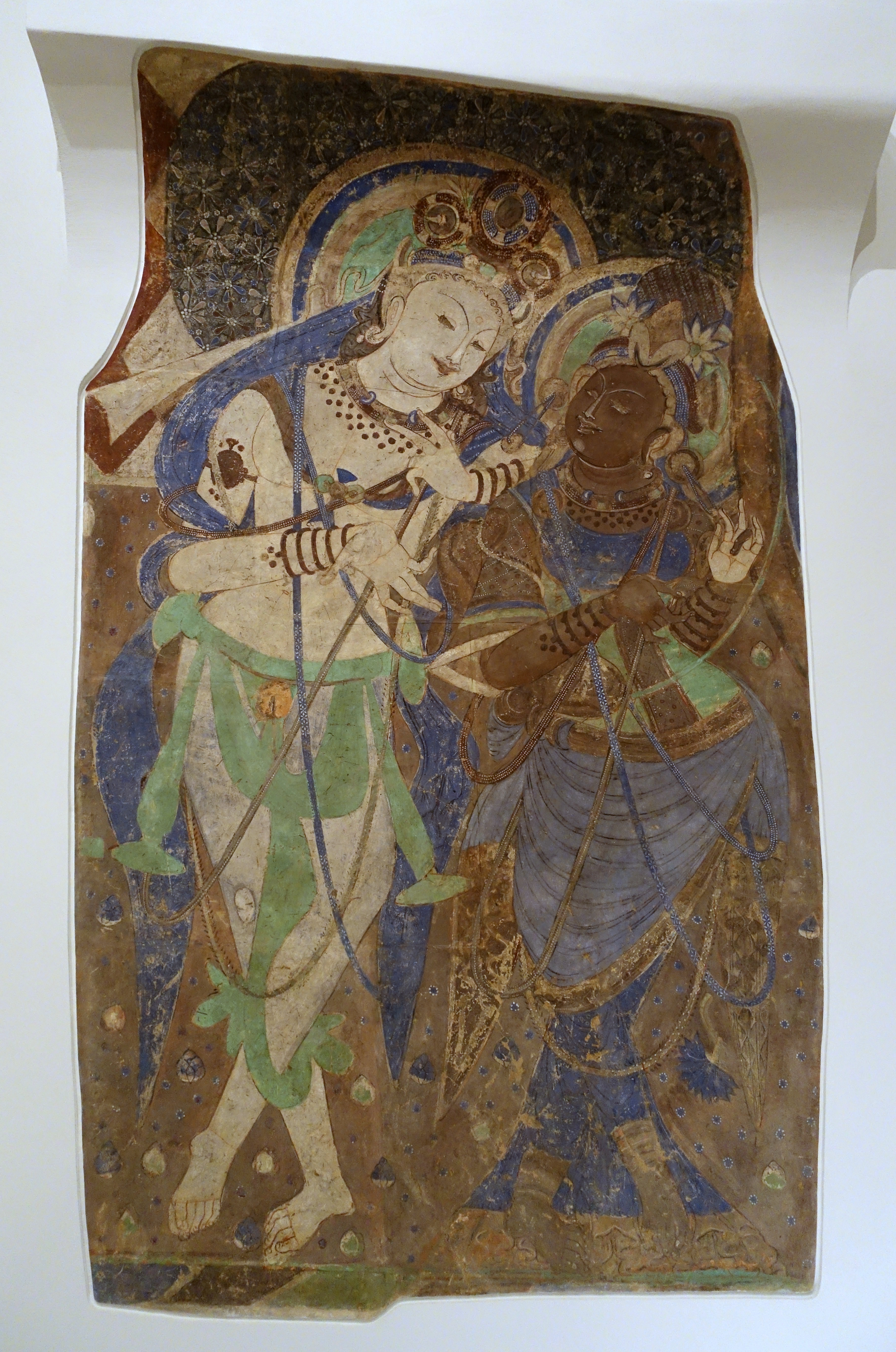
Goddess and celestial musician (Buddhist); 7th century; pigments on plaster; height: 2.03 m; Museum of Asian Art (Berlin, Germany)

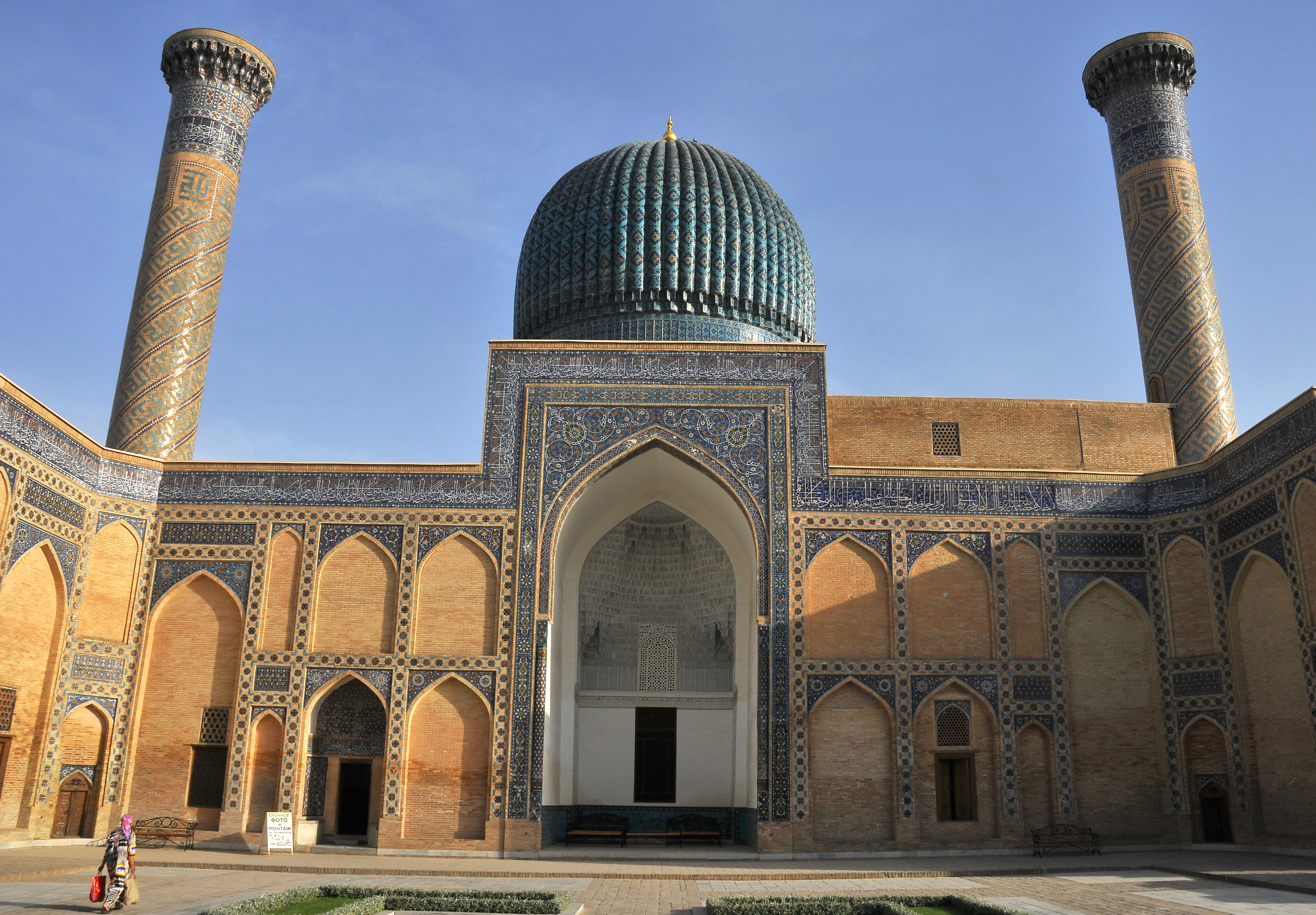
Gur-i Amir Mausoleum (Samarkand, Uzbekistan), 15th century

=== Indian ===
Early Buddhists in India developed symbols related to Buddha. The major survivals of Buddhist art begin in the period after the Mauryans, within North India Kushan art, the Greco-Buddhist art of Gandhara and finally the "classic" period of Gupta art. Additionally, there was the Andhra school which appeared before the Gandhara school and which was based in South India. Good quantities of sculpture survives from some key sites such as Sanchi, Bharhut and Amaravati, some of which remain in situ, with others in museums in India or around the world. Stupas were surrounded by ceremonial fences with four profusely carved toranas or ornamental gateways facing the cardinal directions. These are in stone, though clearly adopting forms developed in wood. They and the walls of the stupa itself can be heavily decorated with reliefs, mostly illustrating the lives of the Buddha. Gradually life-size figures were sculpted, initially in deep relief, but then free-standing. Mathura art was the most important centre in this development, which applied to Hindu and Jain art as well as Buddhist. The facades and interiors of rock-cut chaitya prayer halls and monastic viharas have survived better than similar free-standing structures elsewhere, which were for long mostly in wood. The caves at Ajanta, Karle, Bhaja and elsewhere contain early sculpture, often outnumbered by later works such as iconic figures of the Buddha and bodhisattvas, which are not found before 100 AD at the least.

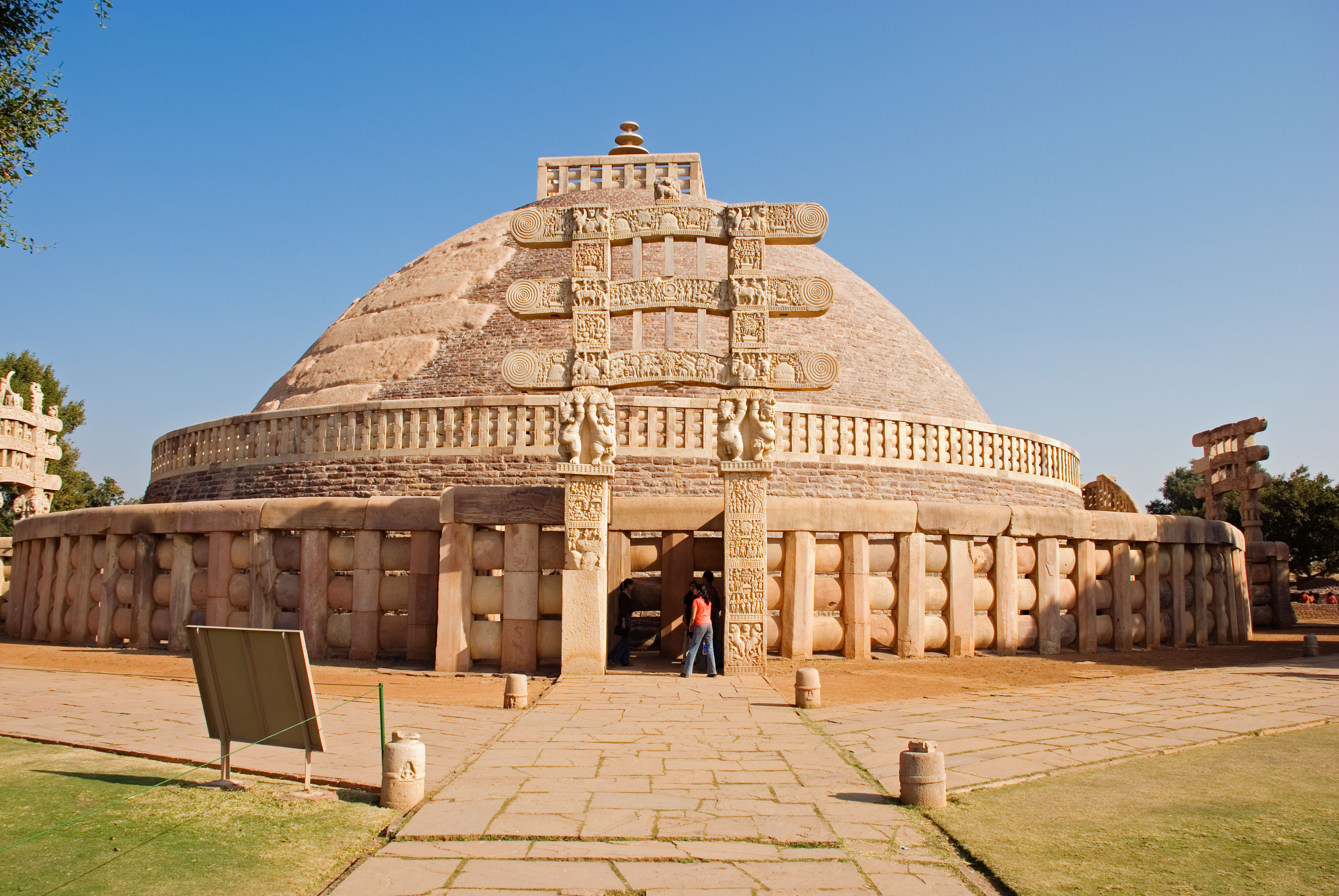
The Great Stupa of Sanchi (Madhya Pradesh, India), 3rd century-c. 100 BC

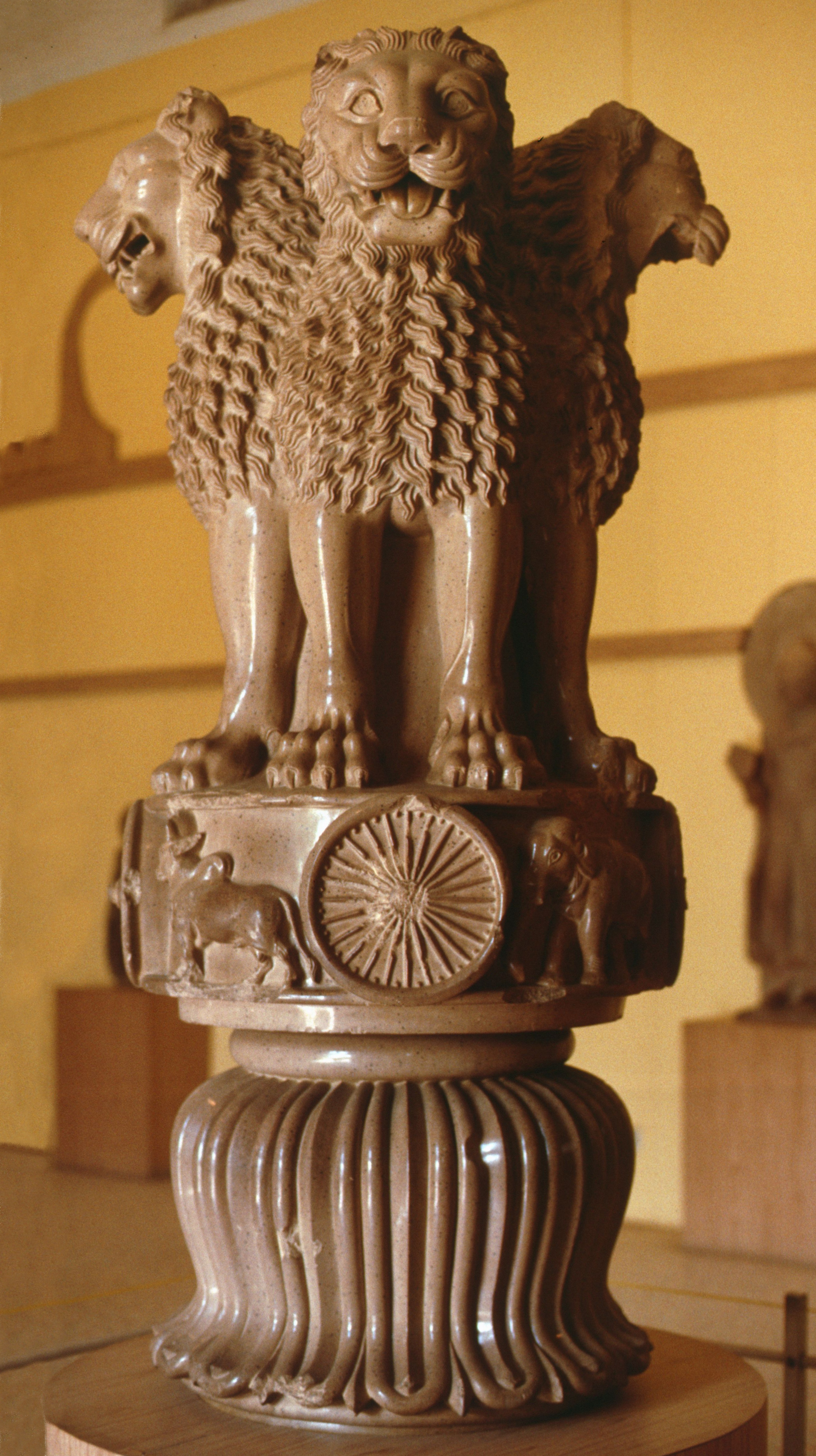
Lion Capital of Ashoka; c. 250 BC; polished sandstone; height: 2.2 m; Sarnath Museum (India)

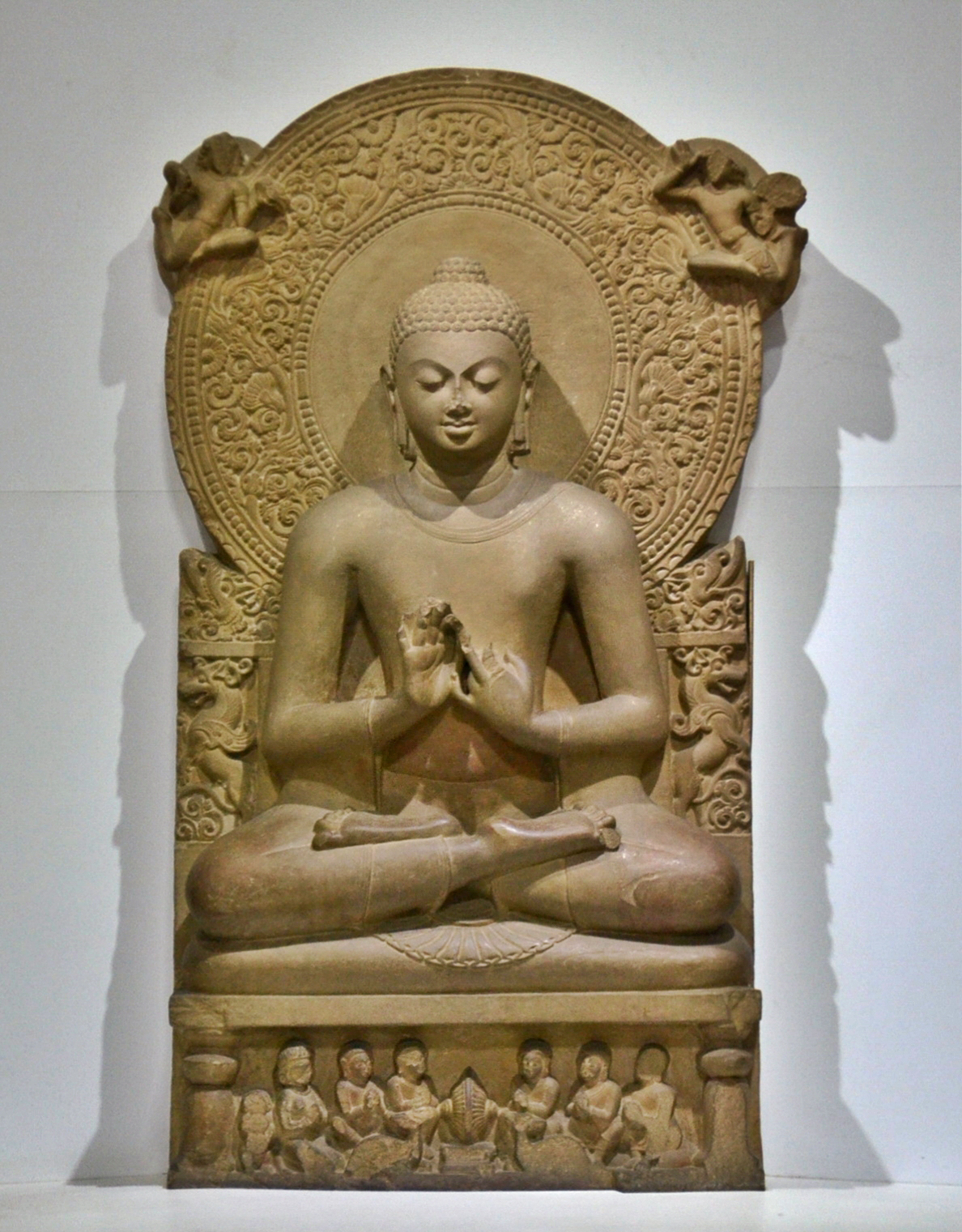
Seated Buddha; c. 475; sandstone; height: 1.6 m; Sarnath Museum

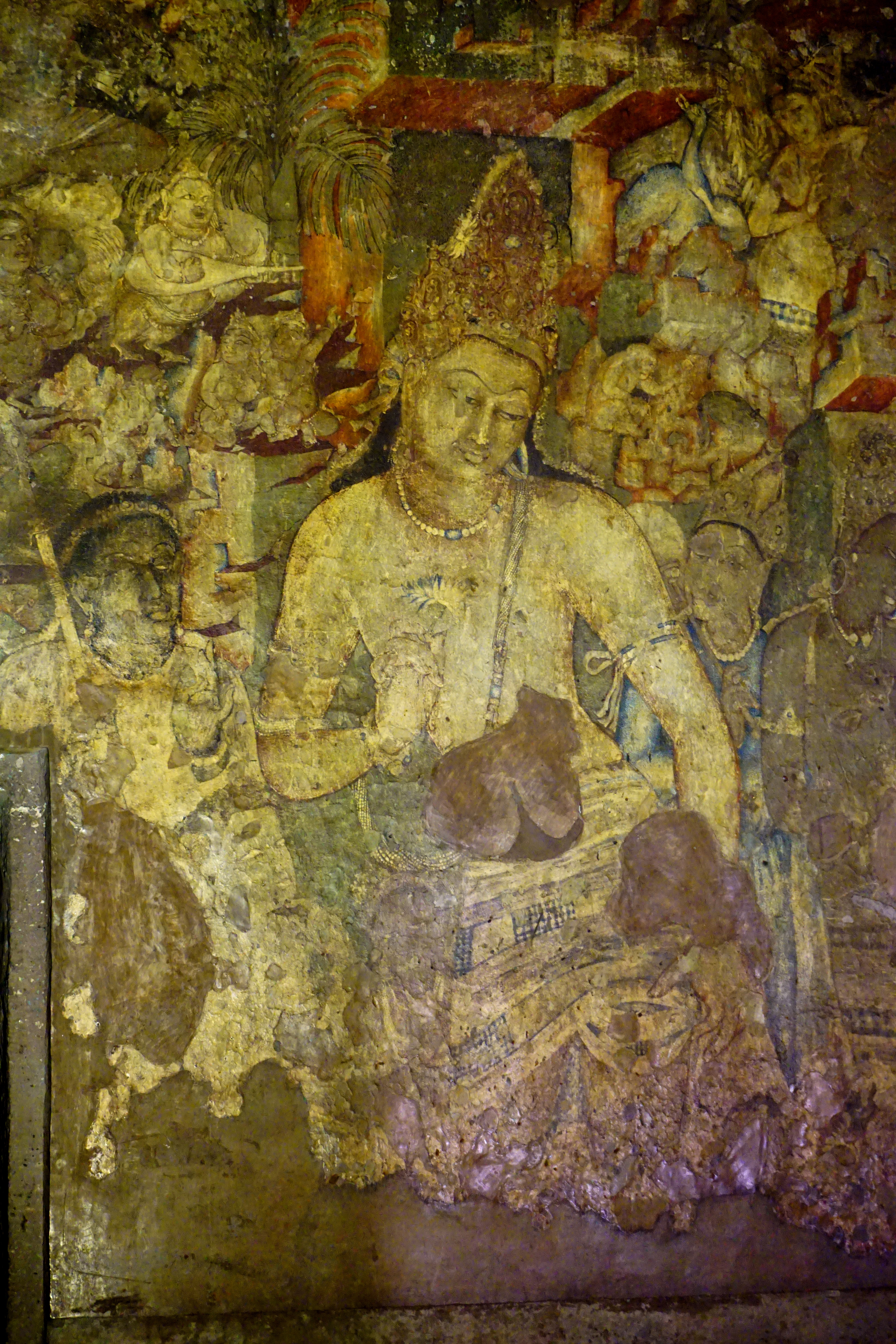
Bodhisattva Padmapani; c. 450–490; pigments on rock; height: c. 1.2 m; Ajanta Caves (India)

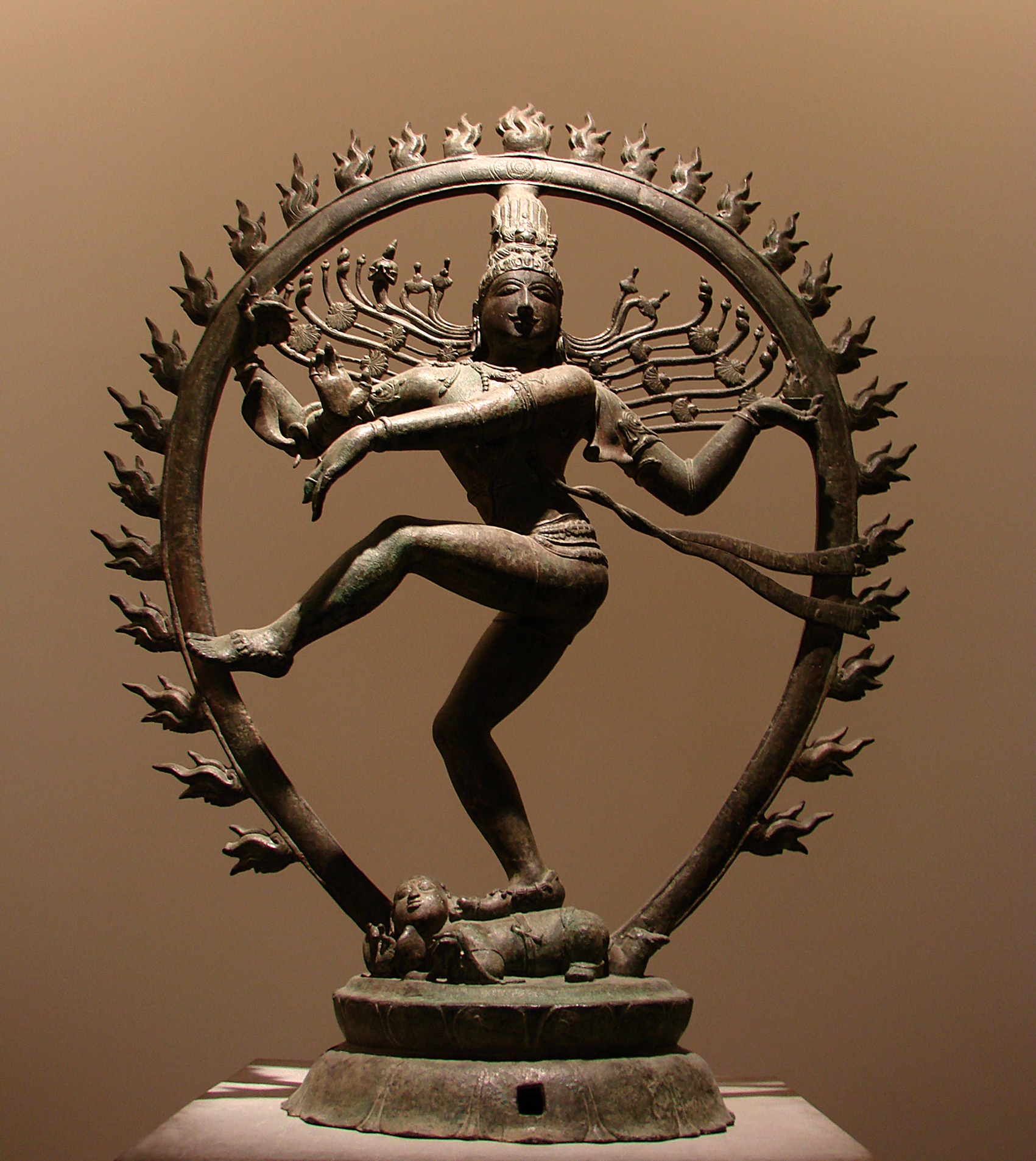
Shiva as lord of the dance; c. 11th century; bronze; height: 96 cm; Musée Guimet (Paris)

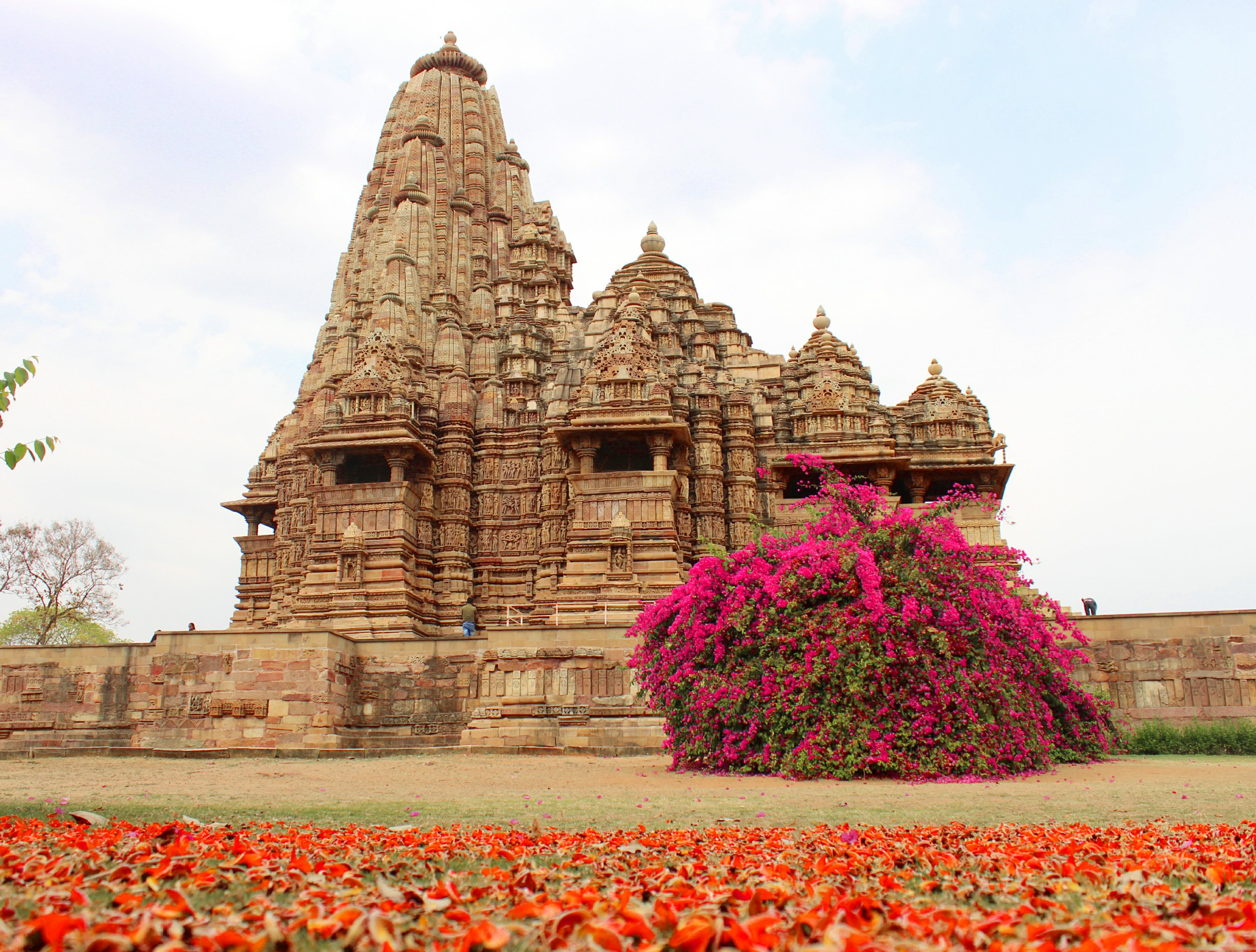
Kandariya Mahadeva Temple (Khajuraho, India), c.1030

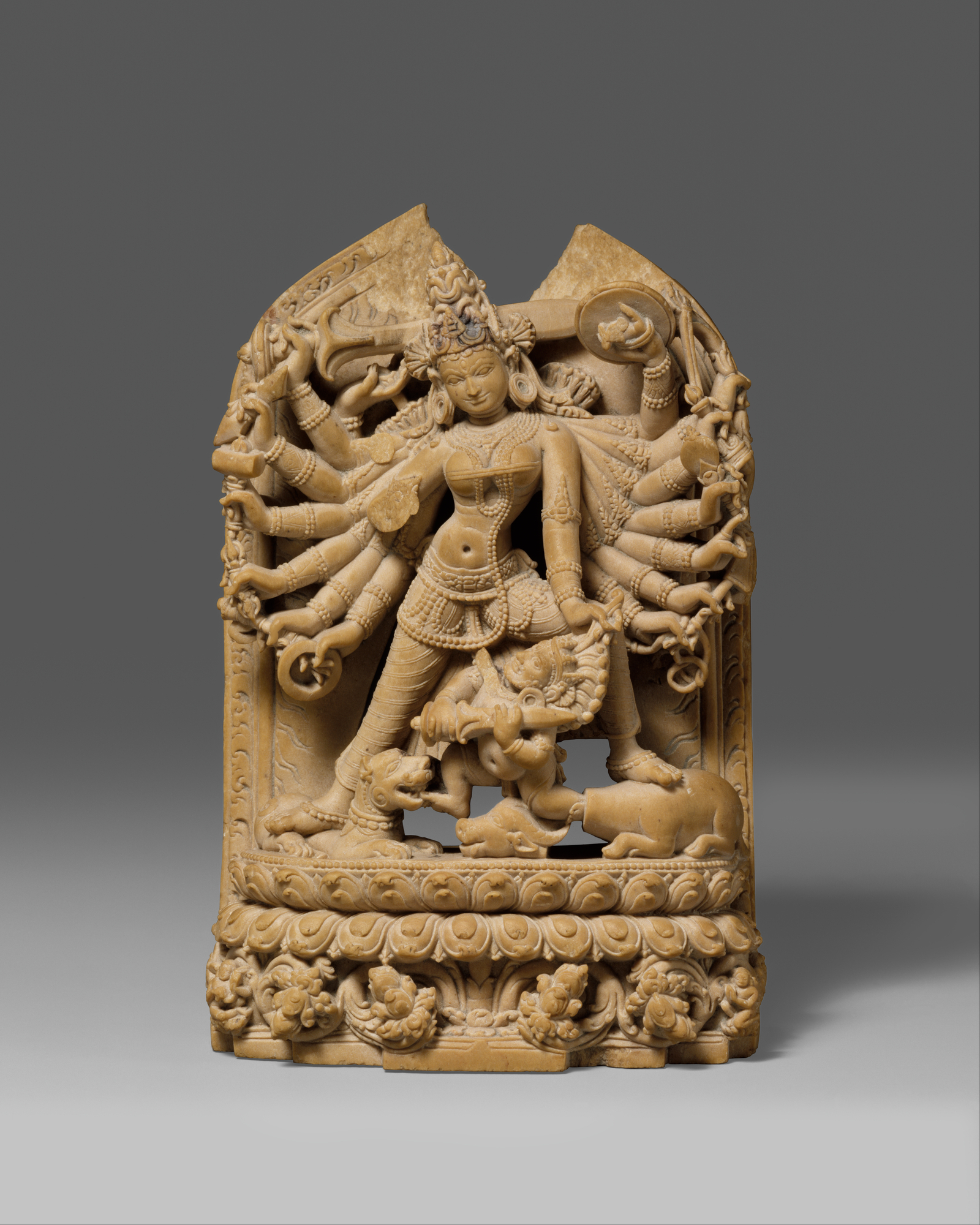
Durga killing the buffalo demon; c.1150; argilite; height: 13.5 cm; Metropolitan Museum of Art (New York City)

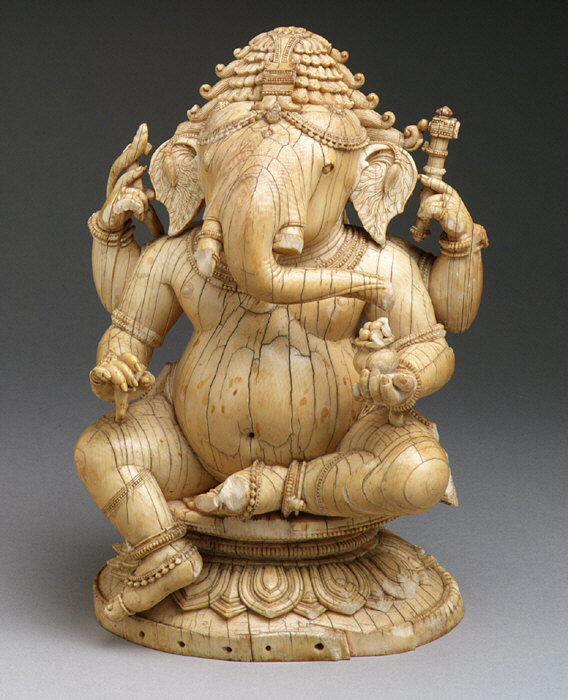
Ganesha; c. 14th-15th century; ivory; height: 18.4 cm; Metropolitan Museum of Art

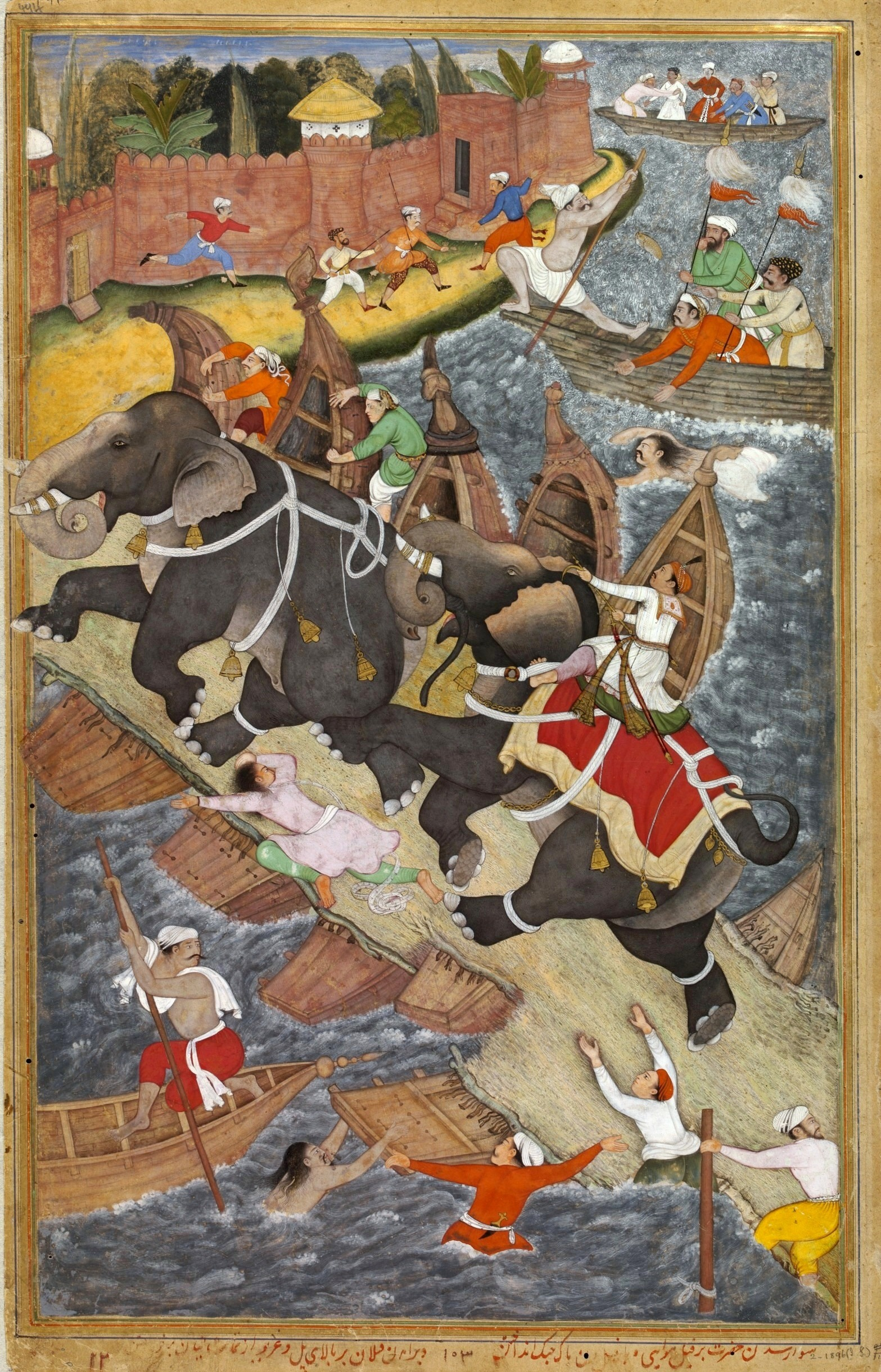
Basawan Akbarnama; c. 1590; watercolor on paper; 33 x 20 cm; Victoria and Albert Museum (London)

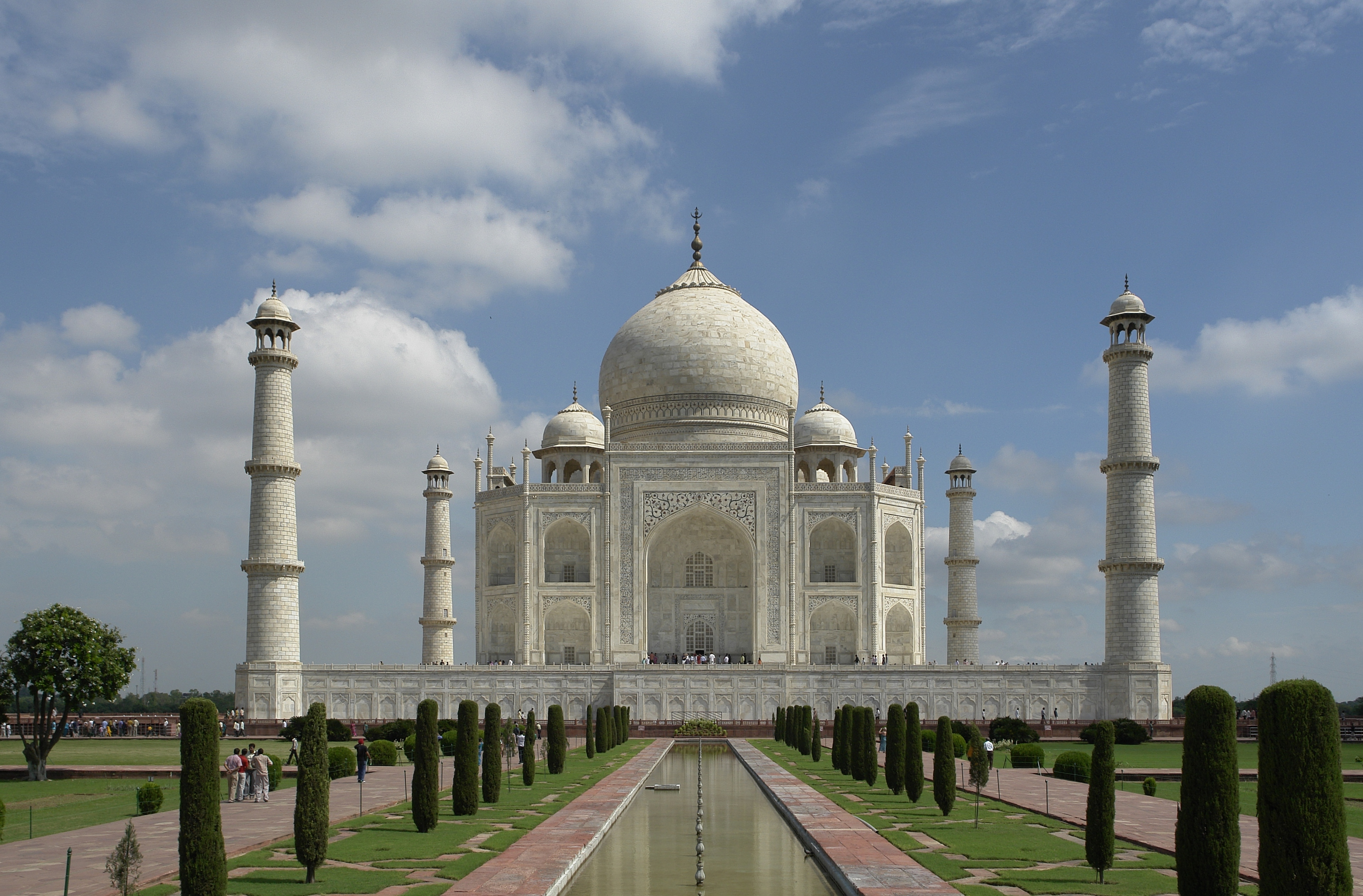
Taj Mahal (Agra, India), an iconic example of Mughal architecture, 1632-1648

=== Chinese ===
In Eastern Asia, painting was derived from the practice of calligraphy, and portraits and landscapes were painted on silk cloth. Most of the paintings represent landscapes or portraits. The most spectacular sculptures are the ritual bronzes and the bronze sculptures from Sanxingdui. A very well-known example of Chinese art is the Terracotta Army, depicting the armies of Qin Shi Huang, the first Emperor of China. It is a form of funerary art buried with the emperor in 210–209 BC whose purpose was to protect the emperor in his afterlife.

Chinese art is one of the oldest continuous traditional arts in the world, and is marked by an unusual degree of continuity within, and consciousness of, that tradition, lacking an equivalent to the Western collapse and gradual recovery of classical styles. The media that have usually been classified in the West since the Renaissance as the decorative arts are extremely important in Chinese art, and much of the finest work was produced in large workshops or factories by essentially unknown artists, especially in Chinese ceramics. The range and quality of goods that decorated Chinese palaces and households, and their inhabitants, is dazzling. Materials came from across China and far beyond: gold and silver, mother of pearl, ivory and rhinoceros horn, wood and lacquer, jade and soap stone, silk and paper.

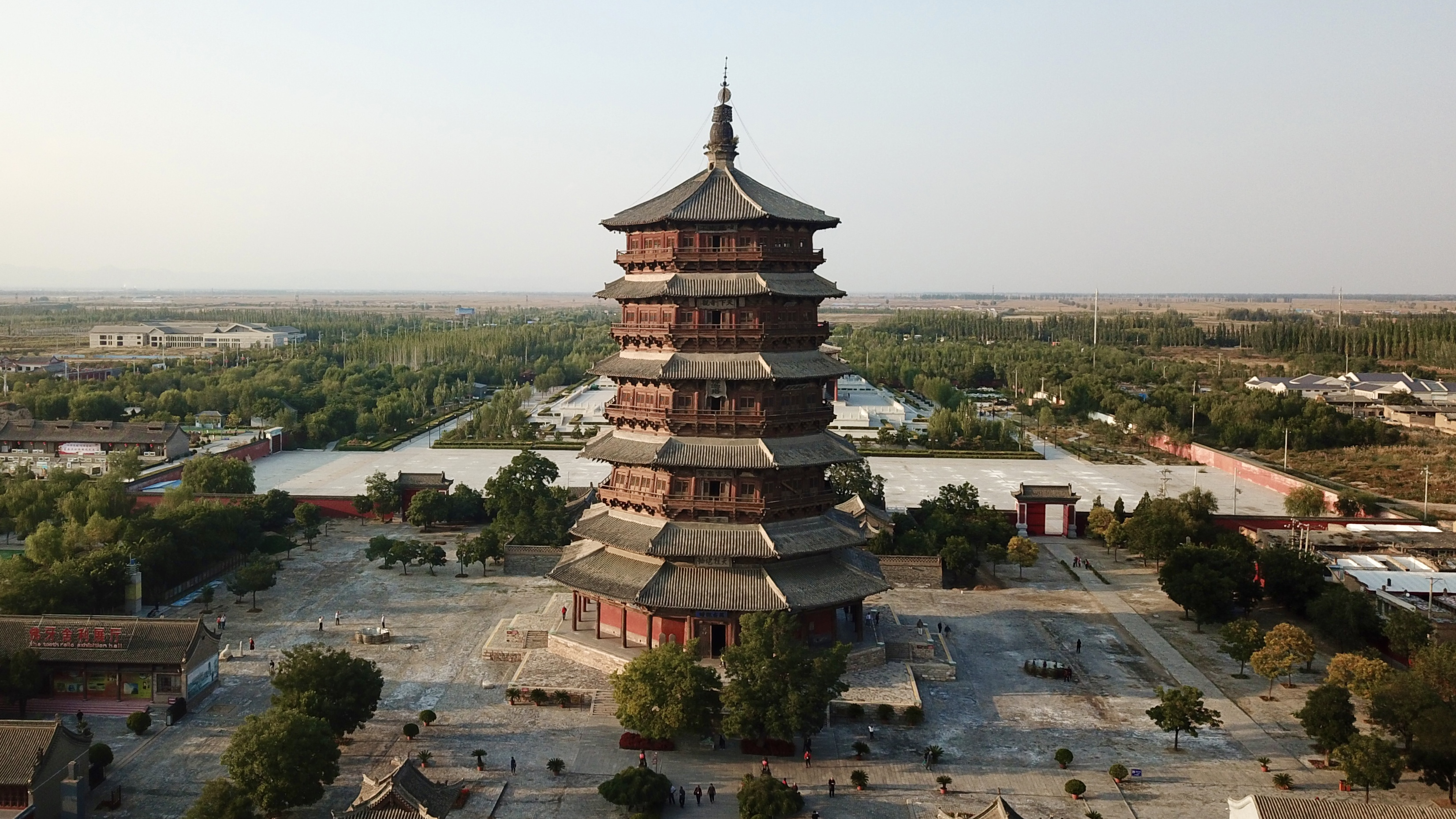
Buddha Pagoda (Fogong Monastery, Yingxian, China), 1056

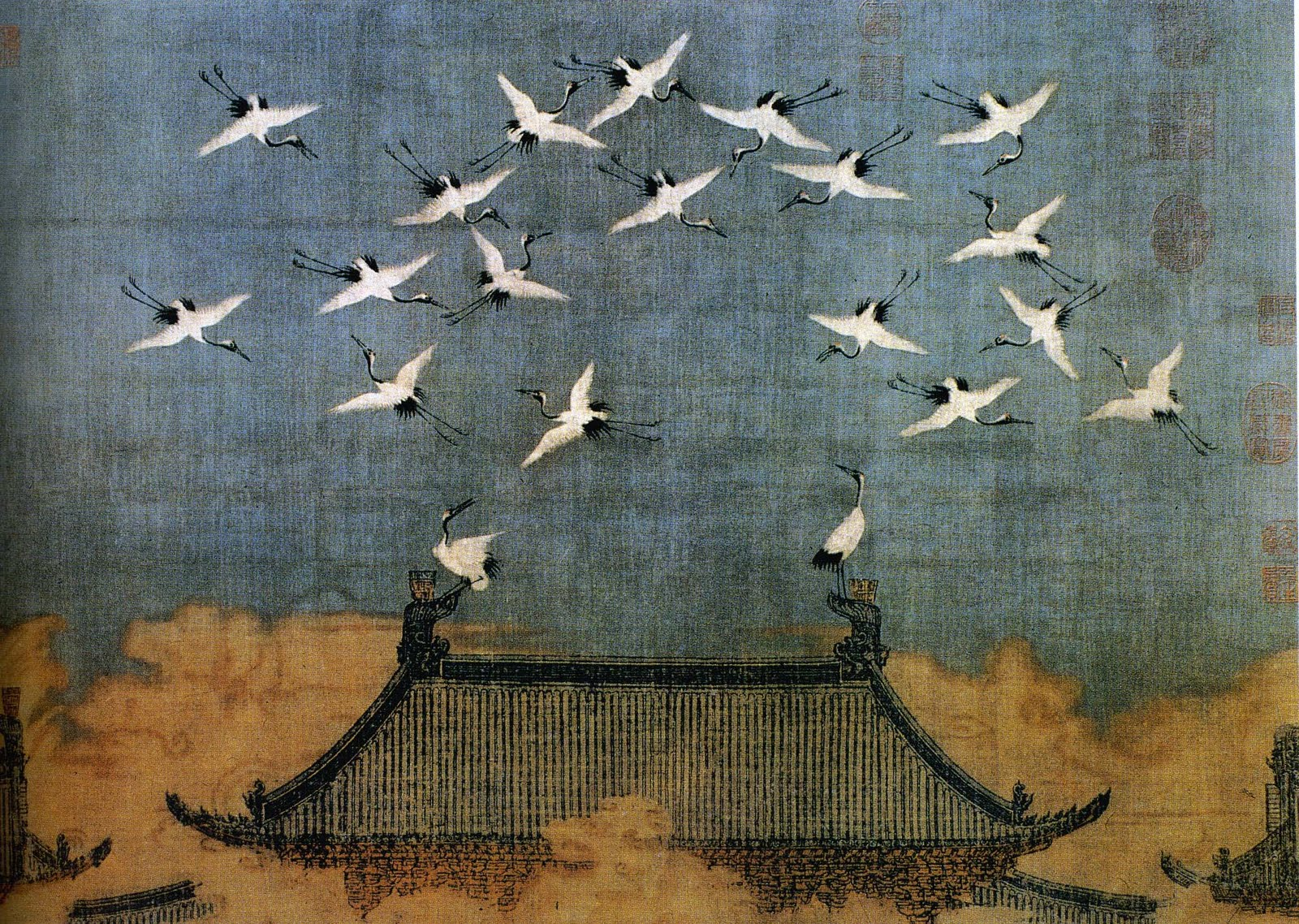
Auspicious Cranes painted by Emperor Huizong of a rare scene on top of a city gate on 16 January 1112.

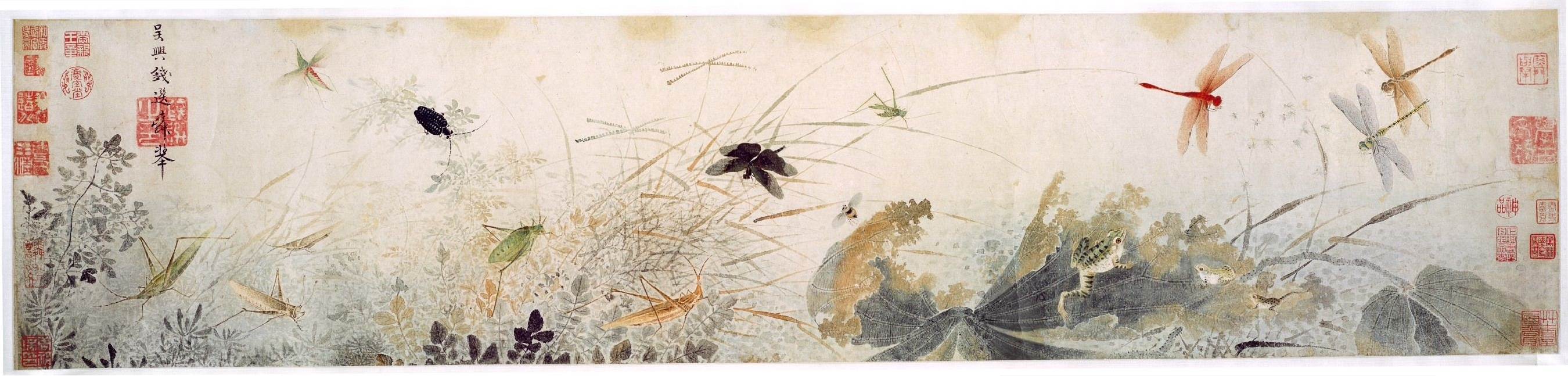
Early Autumn by Qian Xuan, an example of Chinese bird-and-flower painting (13th century)

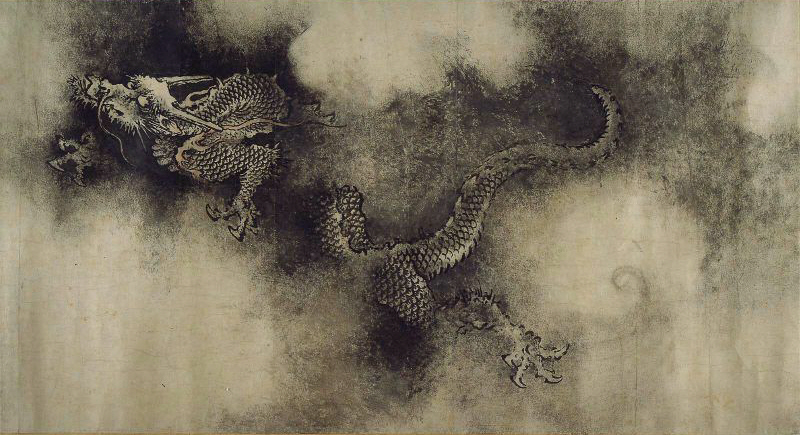
A section of the famous Nine Dragons scroll, completed in 1244 CE

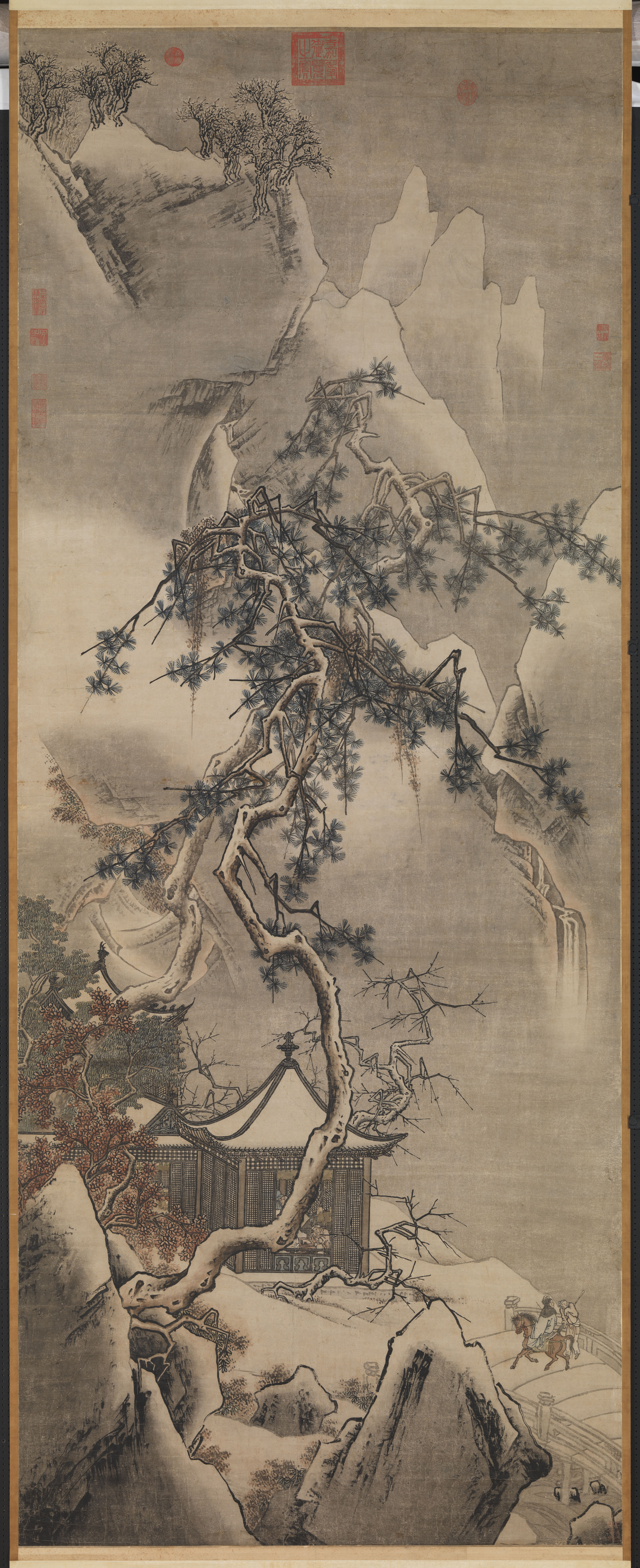
Snowscape by Ma Yuan (c.1160–1225), Taipei National Palace Museum

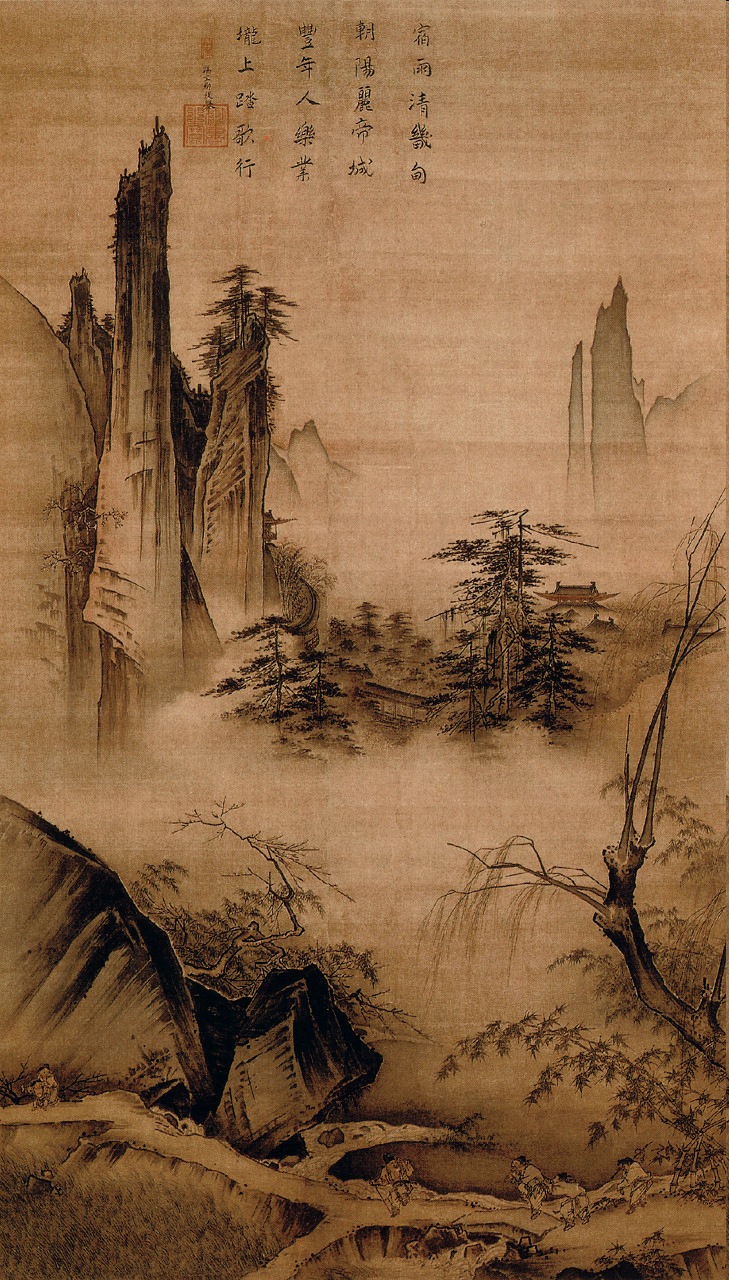
Dancing and Singing (Peasants Returning from Work) c. 1200

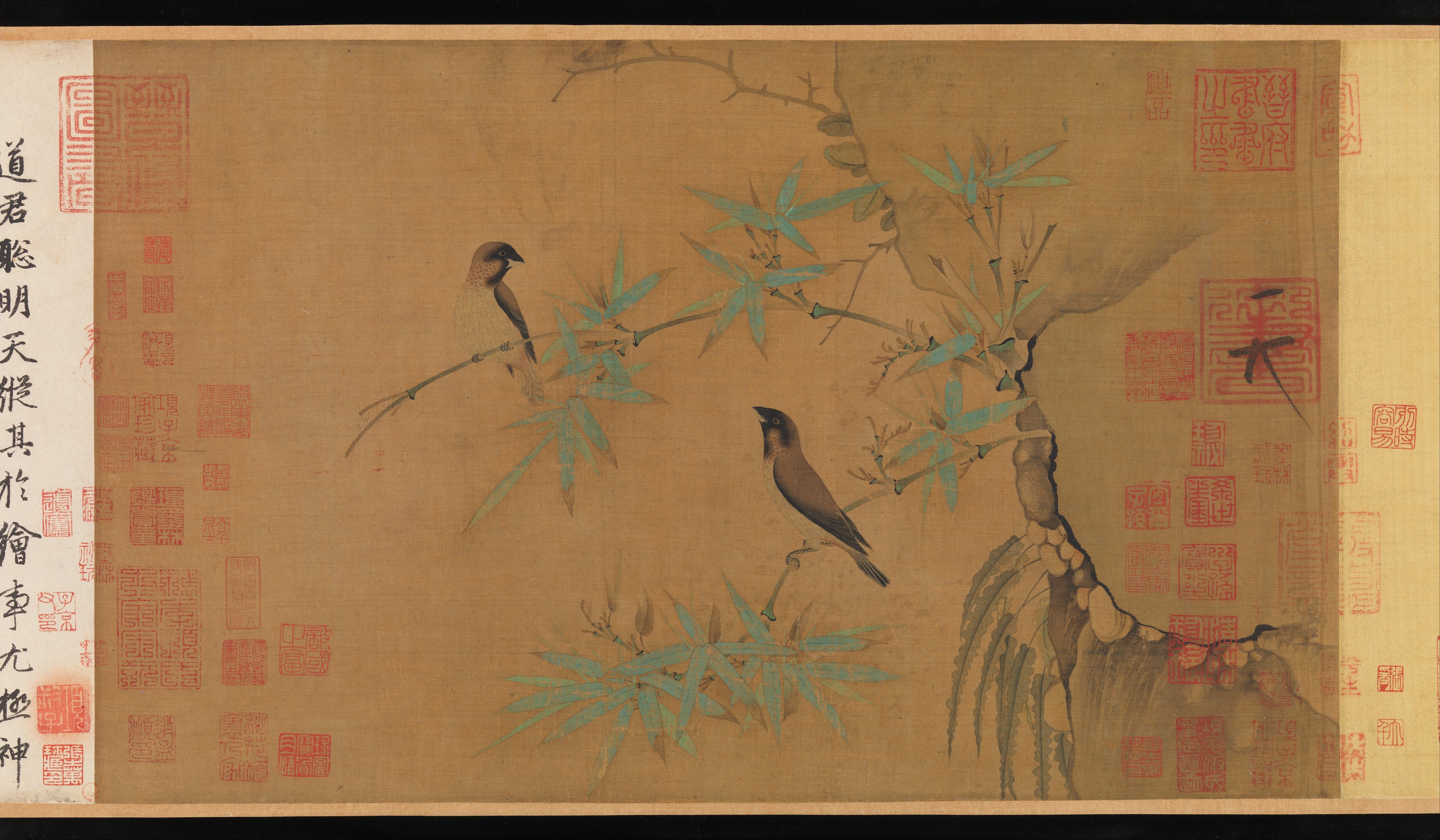
A painting of the Gongbi style by Emperor Huizong

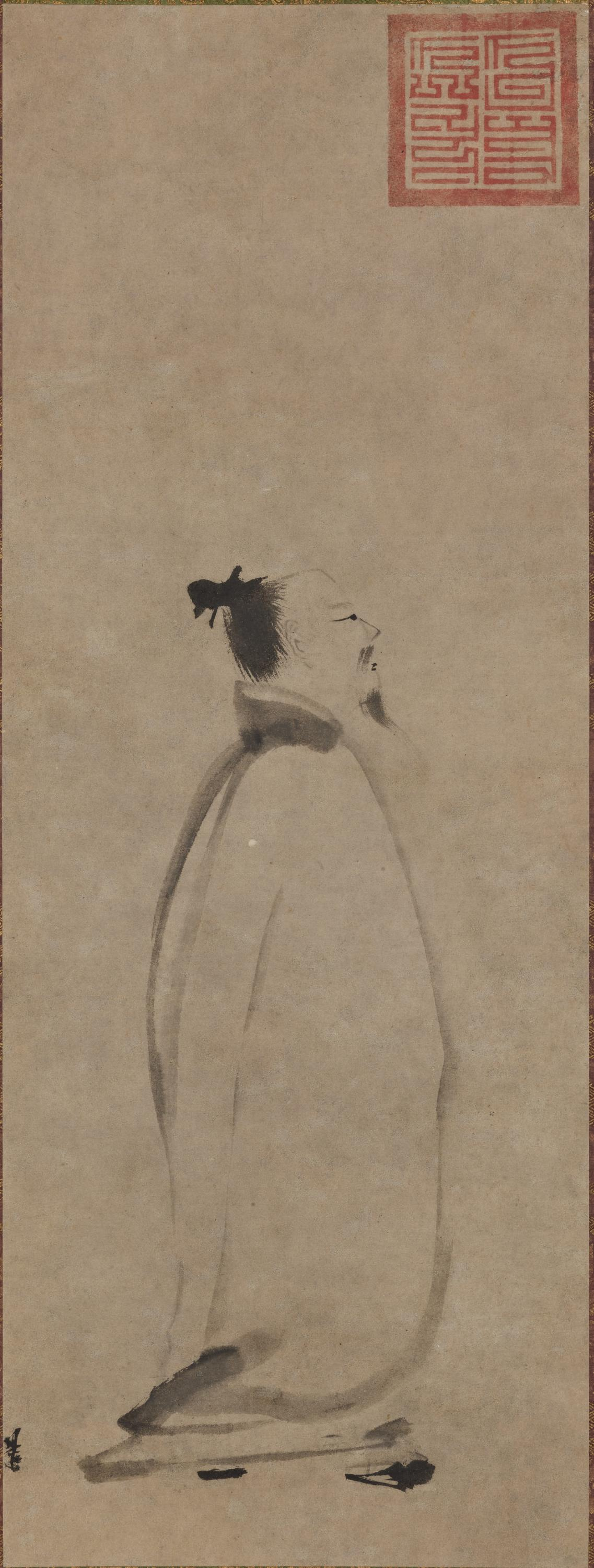
Li Bai strolling by Liang Kai (c.1140 - c.1210), known for his minimalist works exemplifying the buddhist virtue of mindfulness.

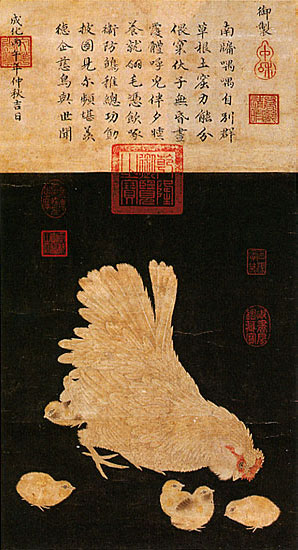
Mother Hen and Chicks, Song dynasty. The high contrast brought on by the black background is very rare in Chinese painting.

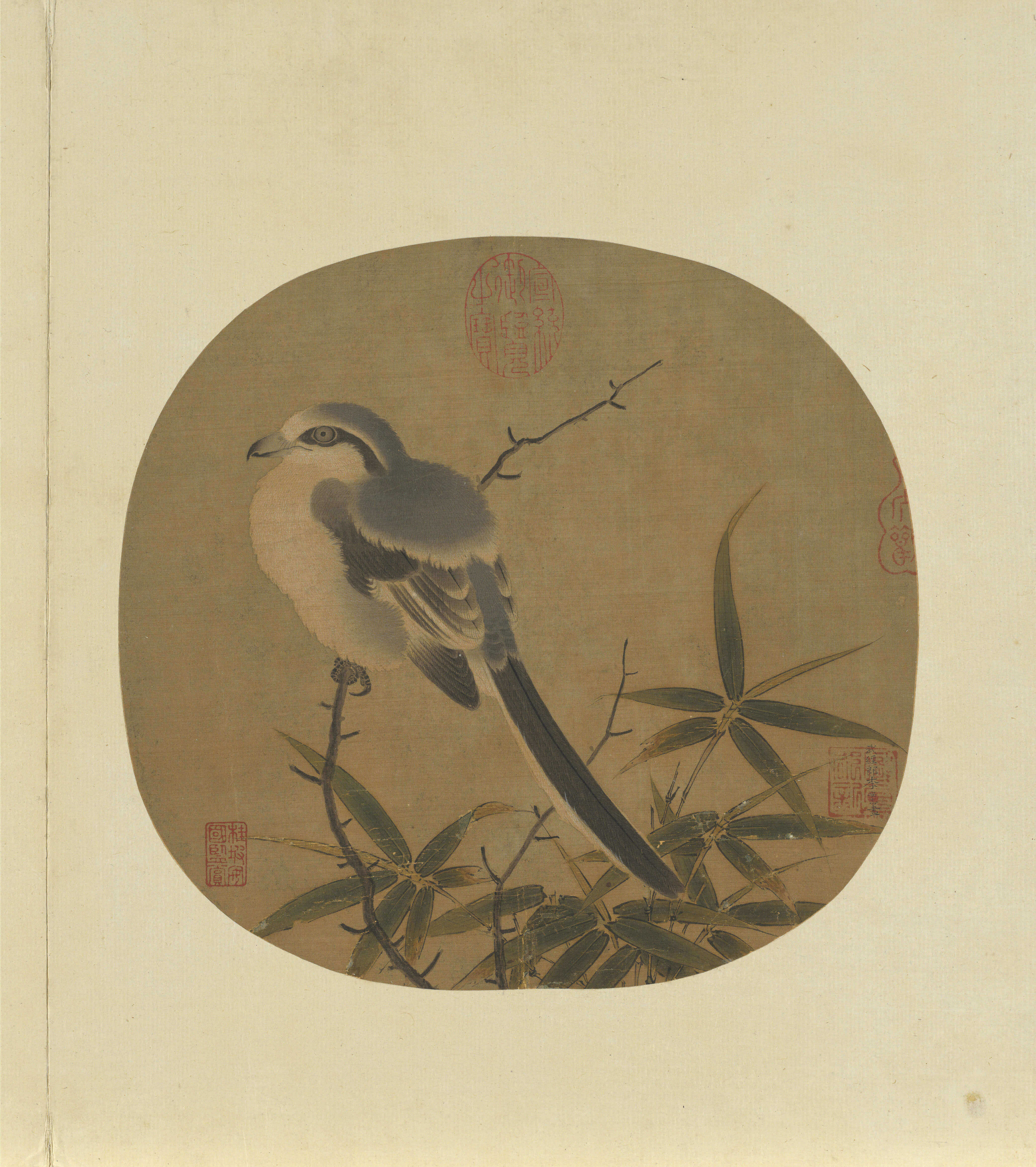
Li Anzhong's Bird on a Branch, late Northern Song c. 1130

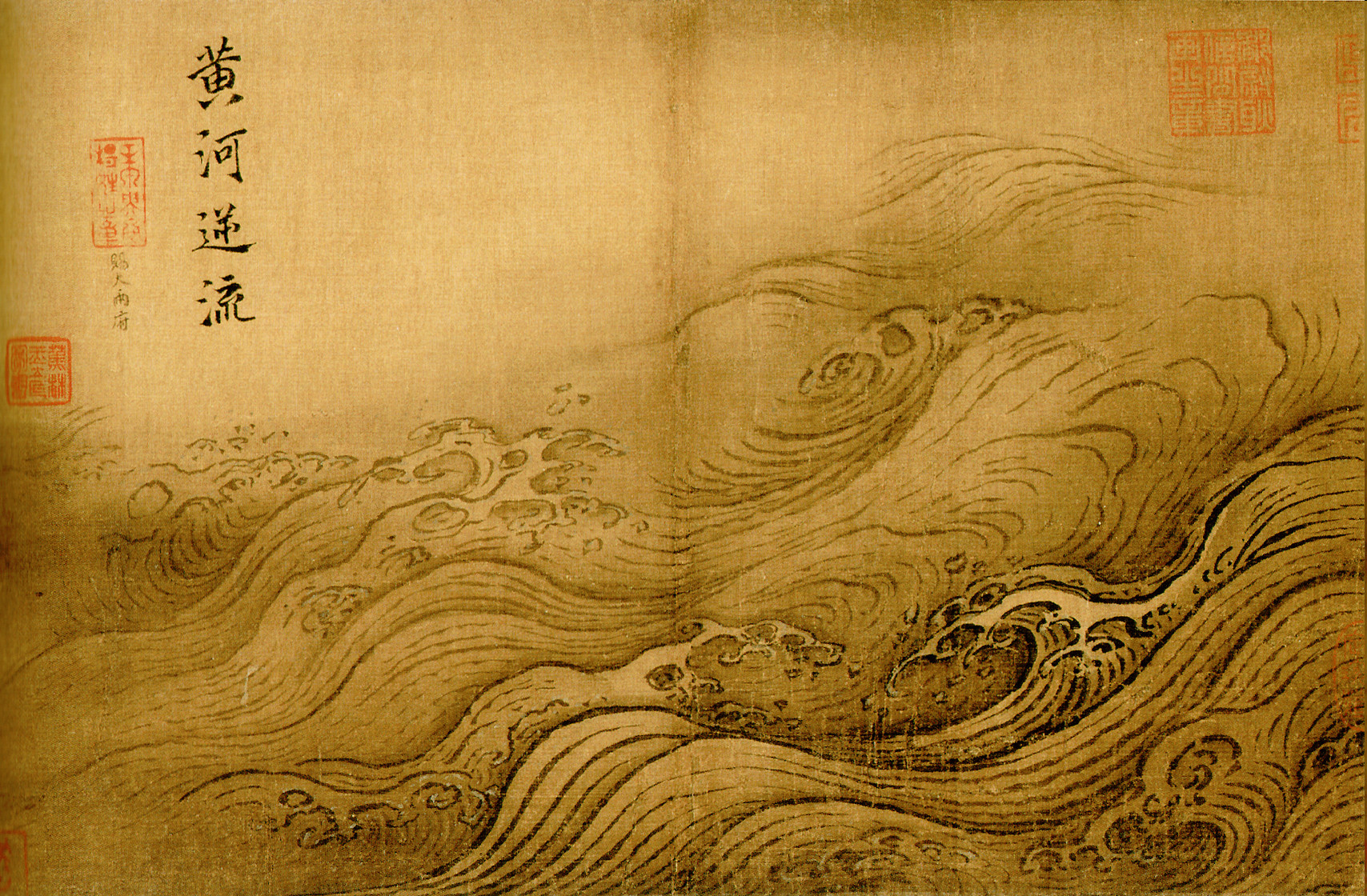
The Yellow River Breaches its Course, Song dynasty

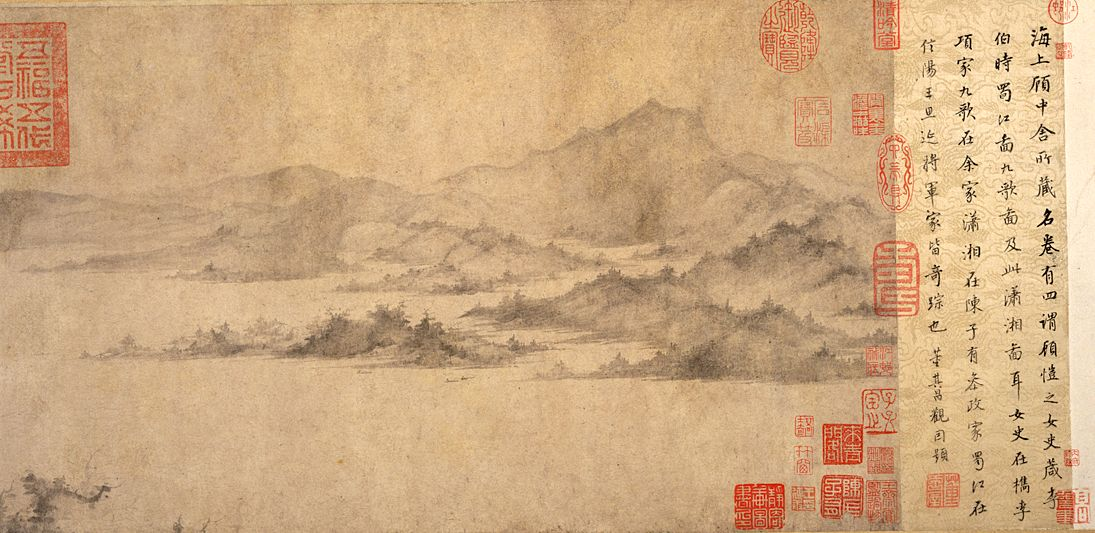
Section of Eight Views of Xiaoxiang, an imaginary tour through Xiaoxiang by Li Shi; 12th-century. Tokyo National Museum

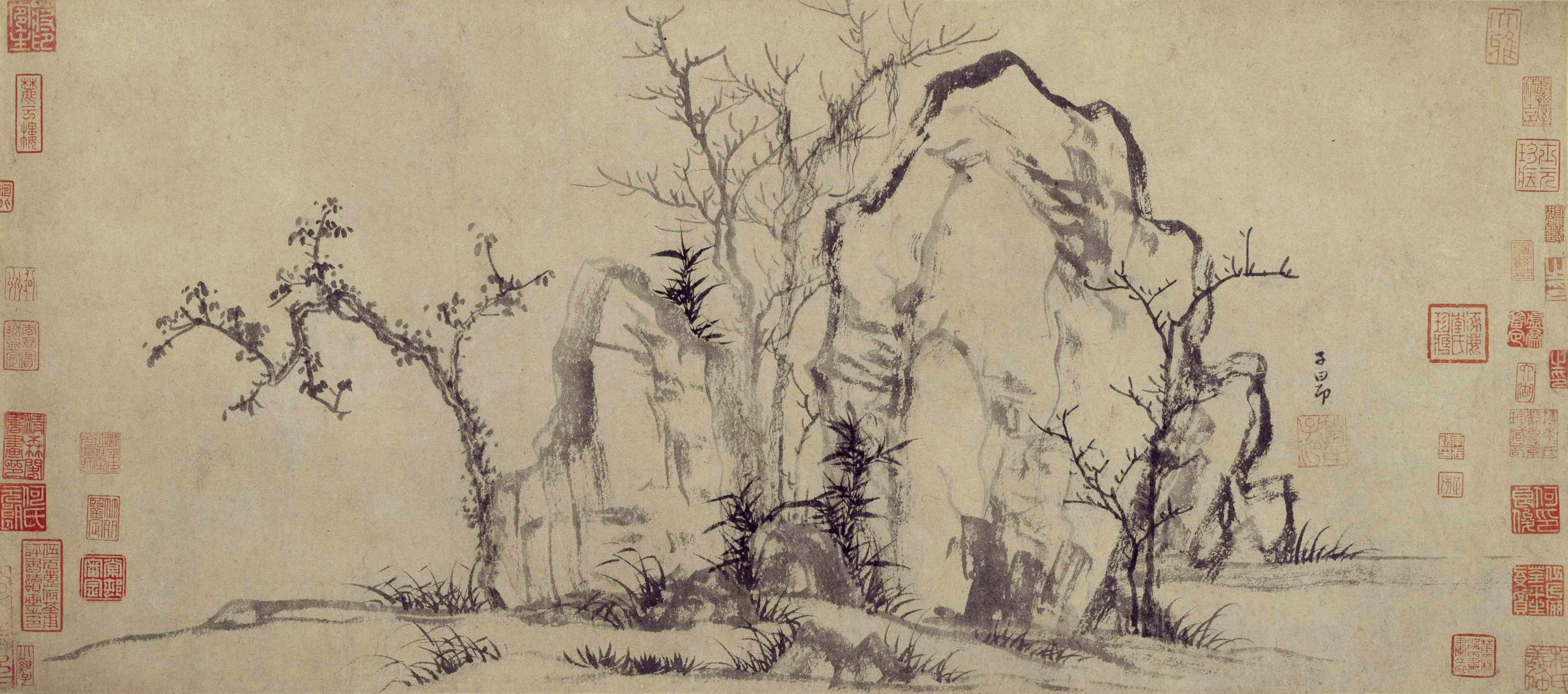
Elegant Rocks and Sparse Trees by Zhao Mengfu (1254–1322)

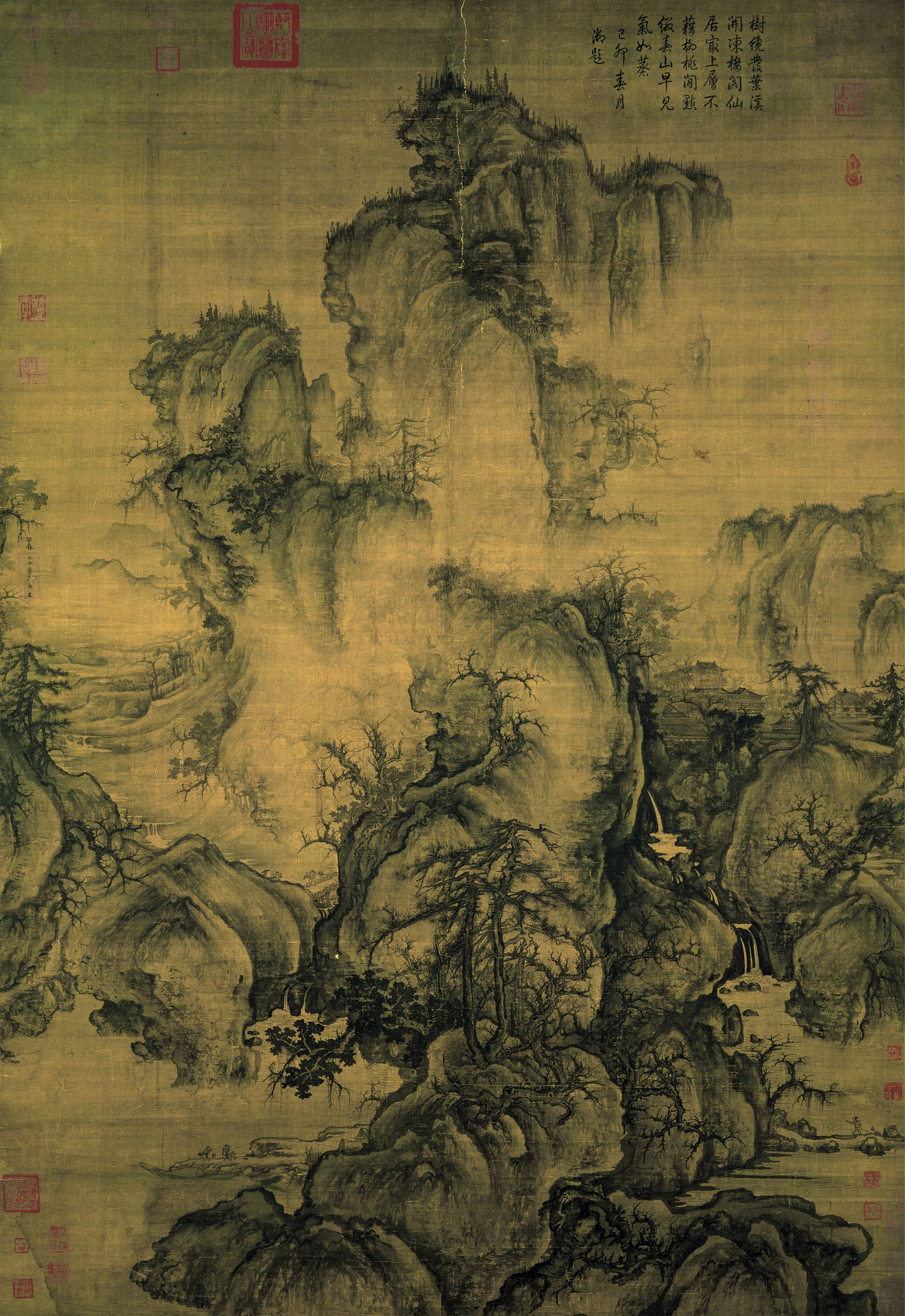
Early Spring; by Guo Xi; 1072; hanging scroll, ink on silk; 1.58 x 1.08 m; National Palace Museum (Taipei, Taiwan)

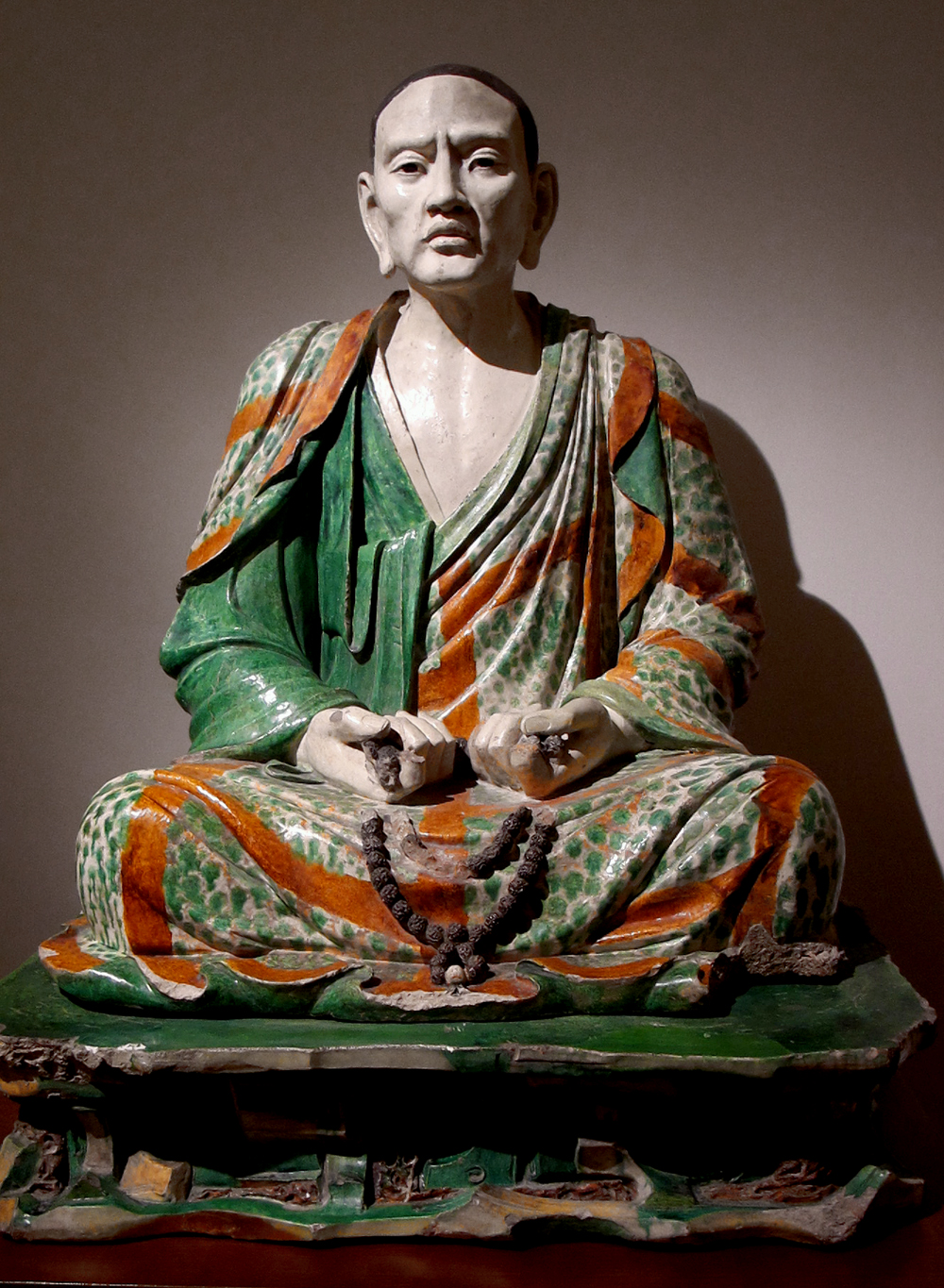
Statue of the luohan Tamrabhadra, one of the group of glazed pottery luohans from Yixian; 10th–13th century; glazed terracotta; height: 123 cm; Guimet Museum (Paris)

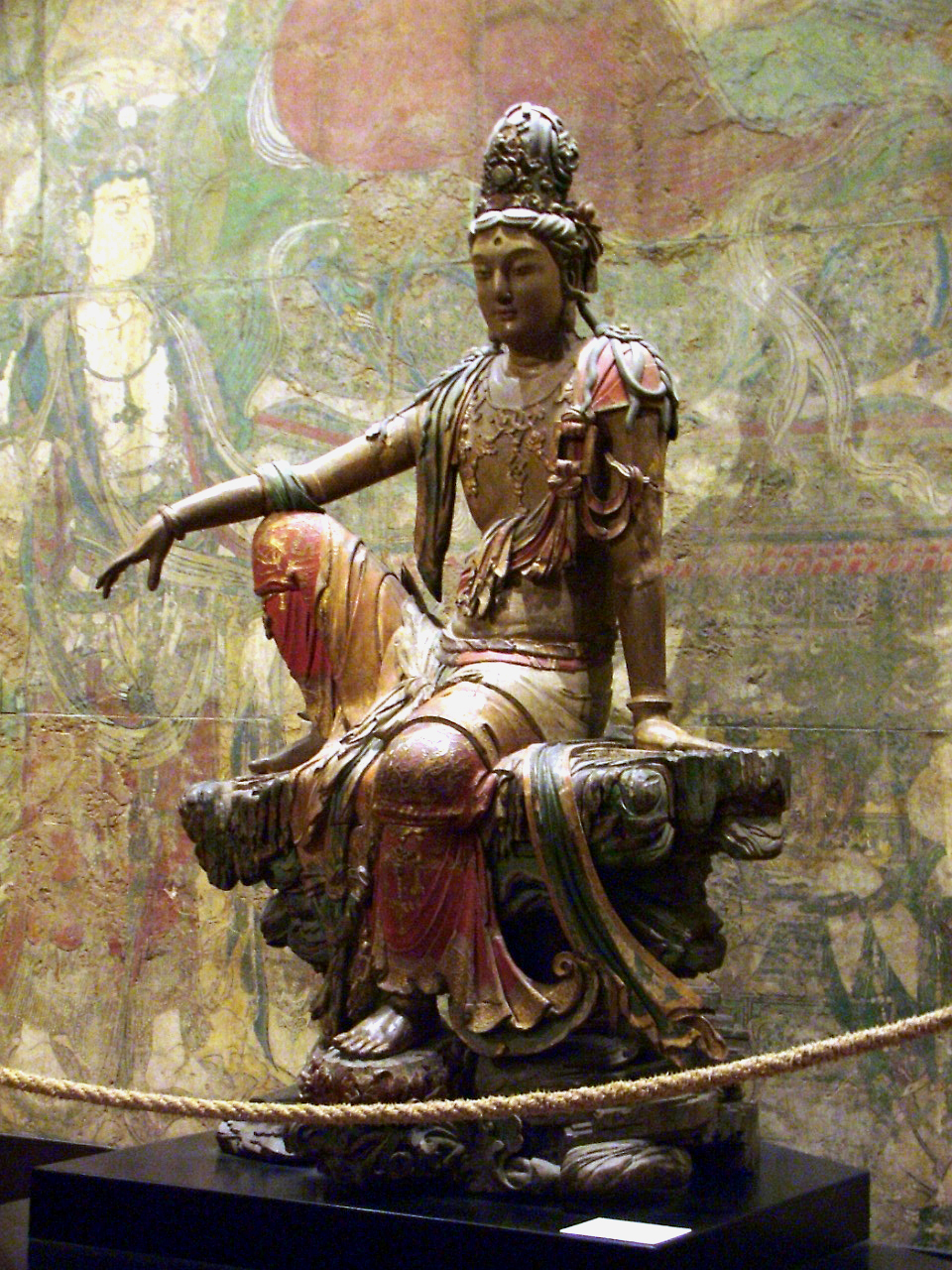
Guanyin of the Southern Seas; 11th-12th century; painted and gilded wood; height: 2.41 m; Nelson-Atkins Museum of Art (Kansas City, Missouri, US)

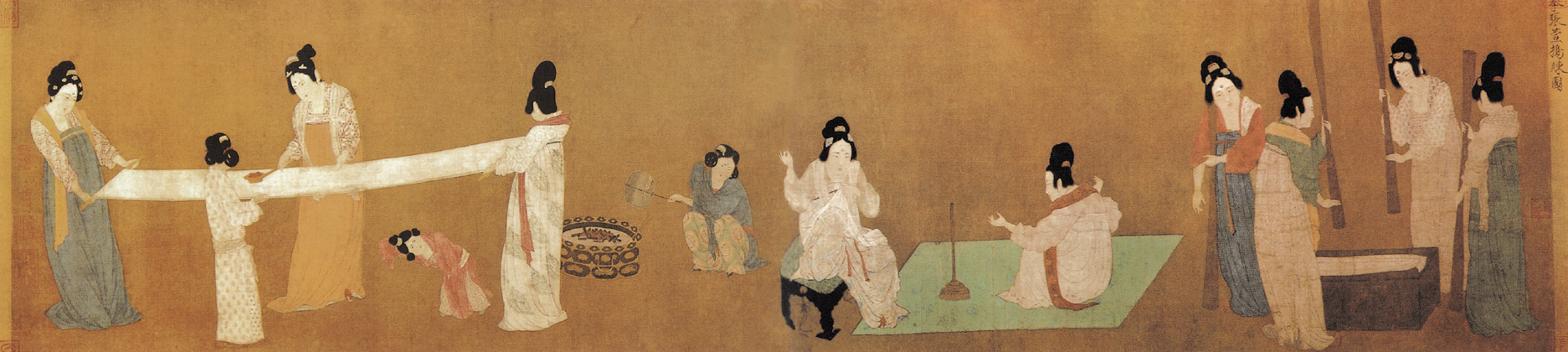
Ladies Preparing Silk; an 8th century Tang dynasty painting by Zhang Xuan copied and reproduced in the Song dynasty; ink and colours on silk; 0.37 x 1.47 m; Museum of Fine Arts (Boston, US)

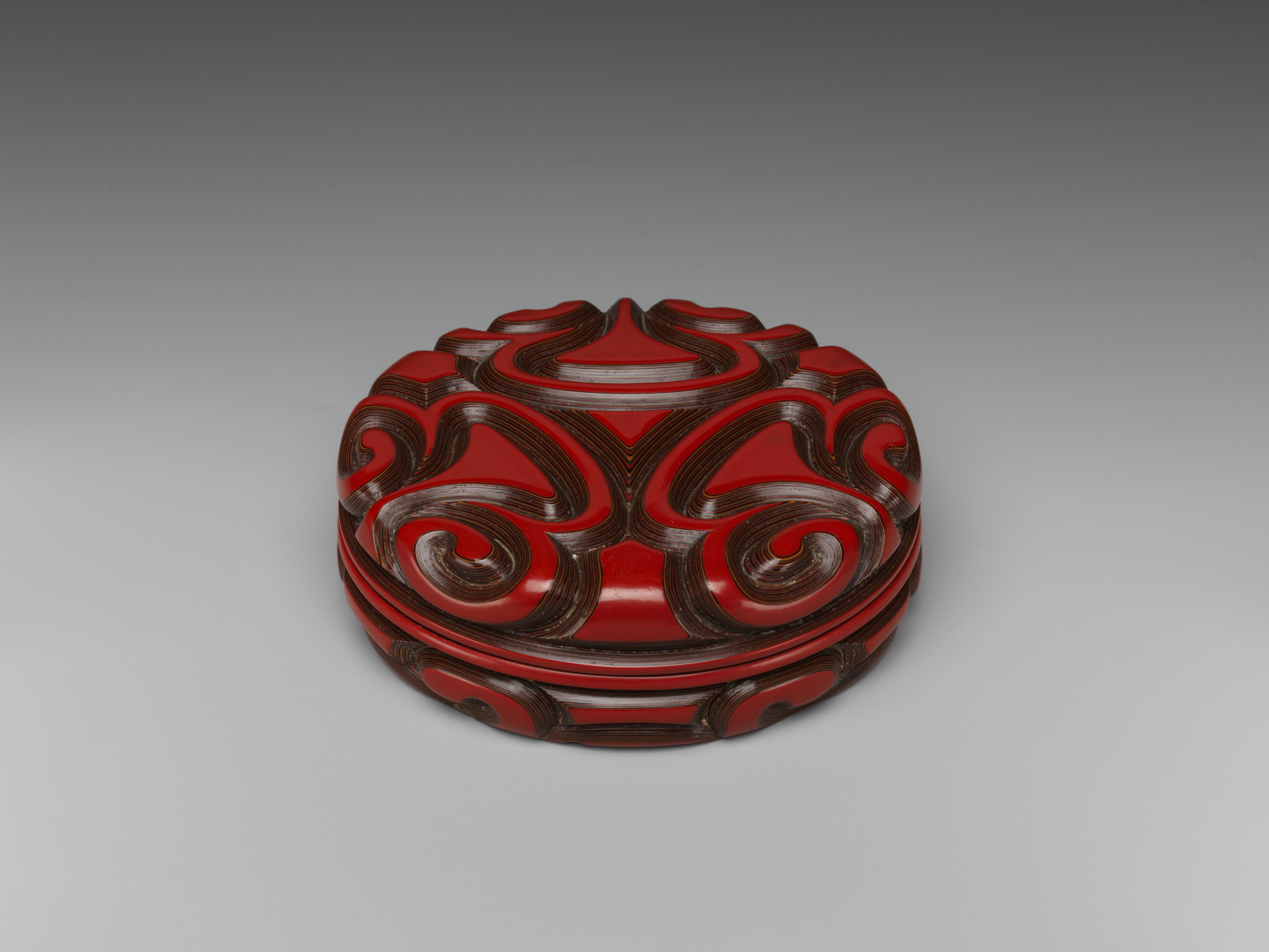
A decorative box from the southern Song dynasty c. 13th century

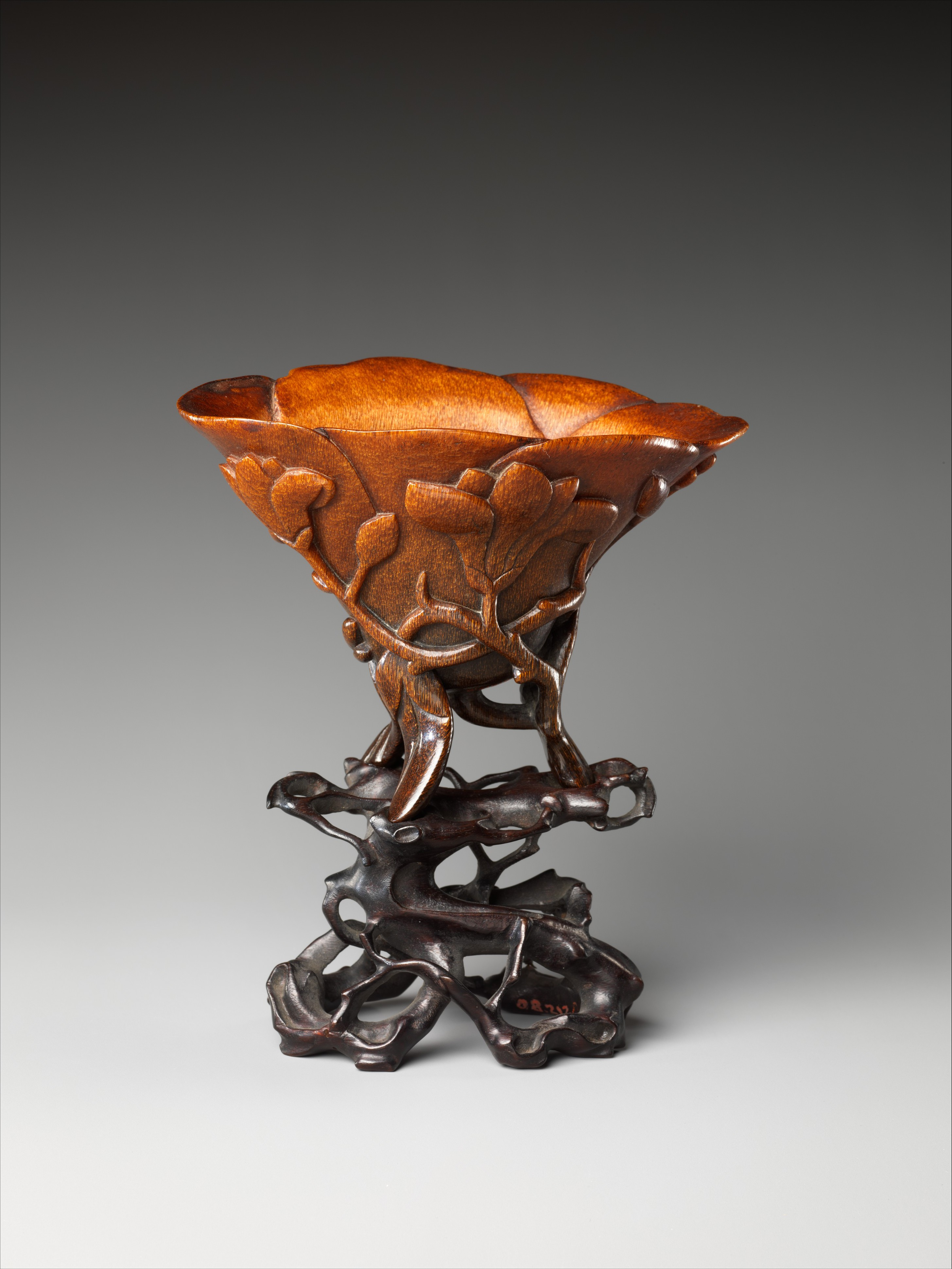
Cup; early 17th century; rhinoceros horn; height: 10.2 cm; Metropolitan Museum of Art

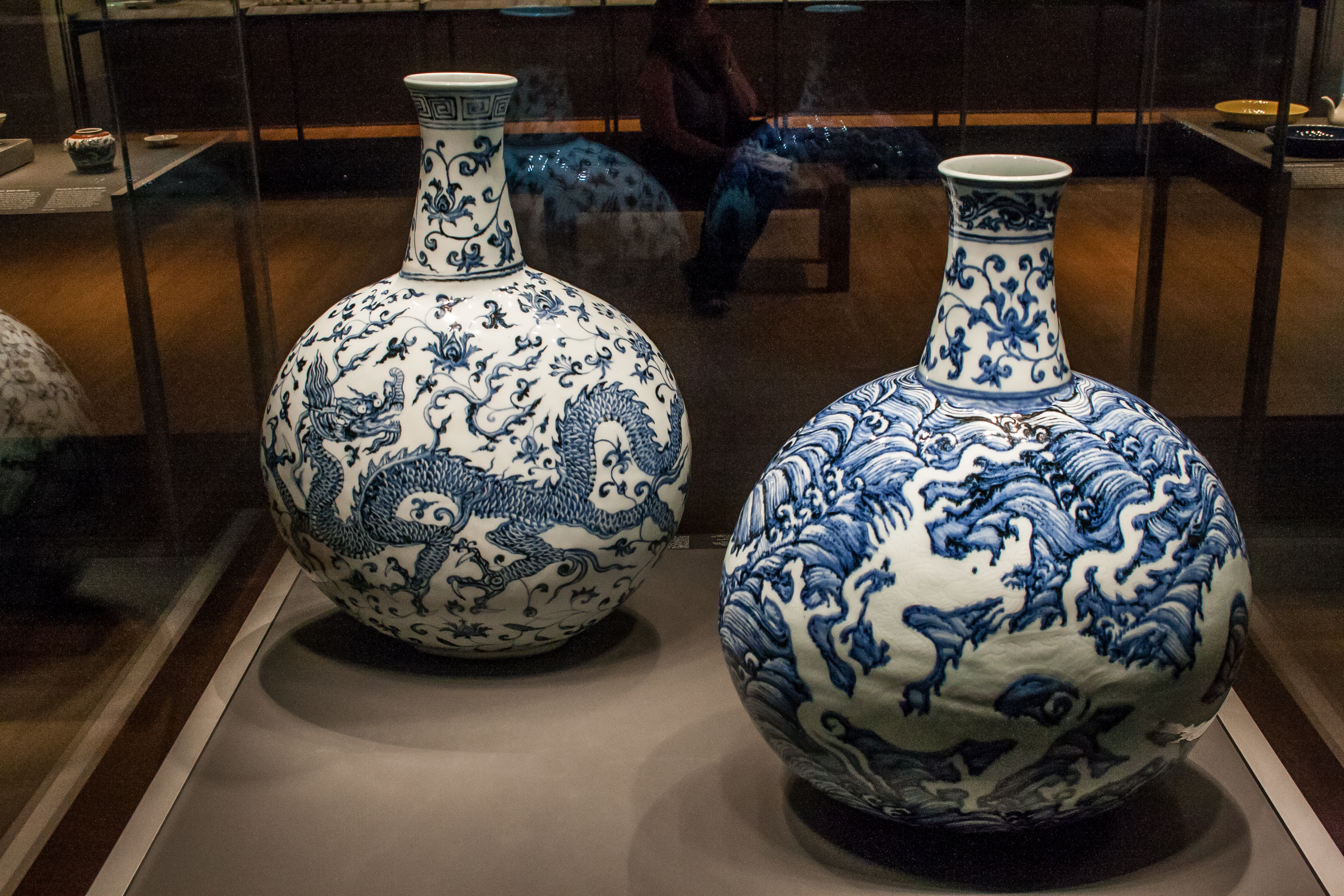
Ming dynasty, 1403-24.

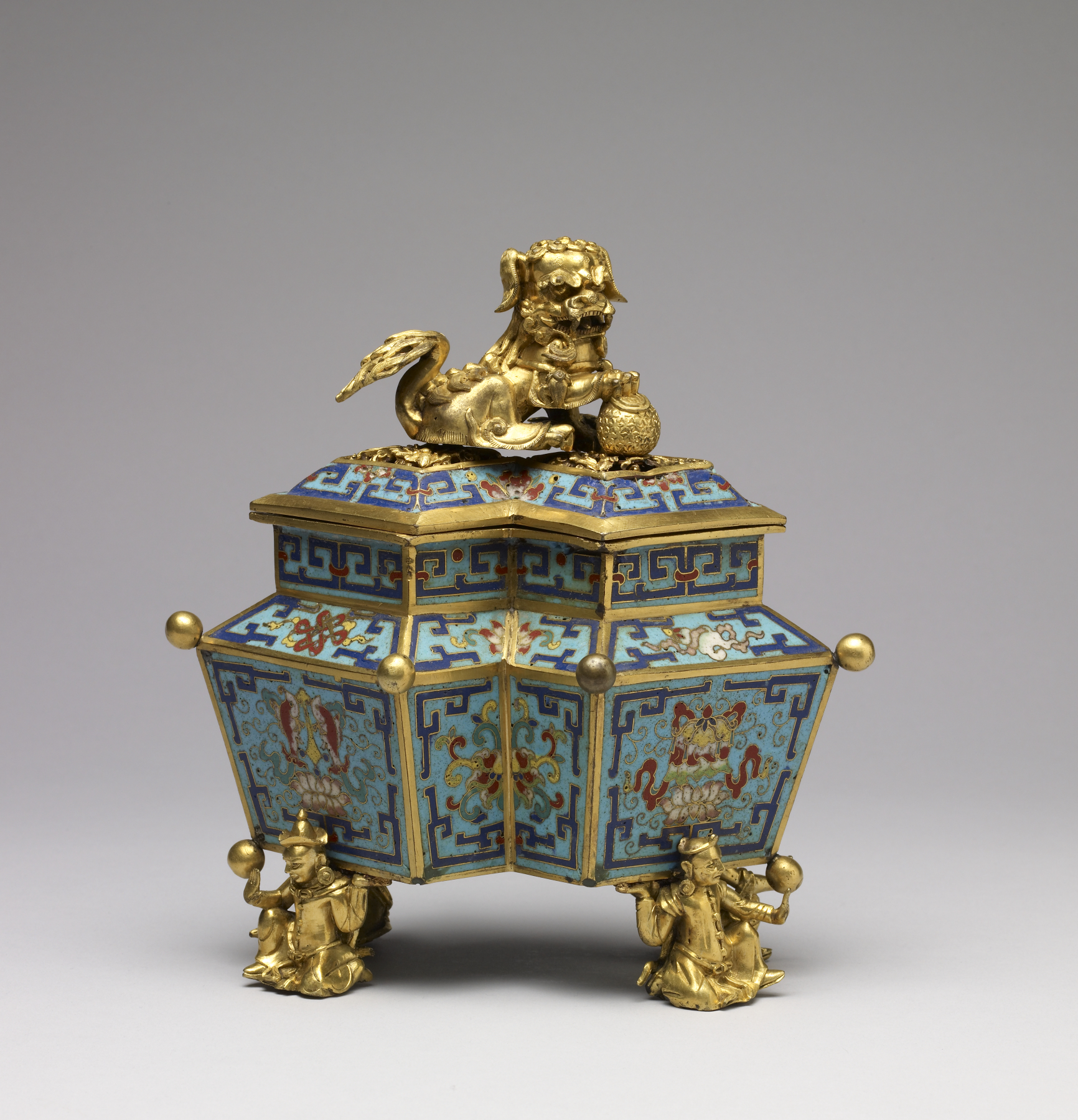
Cloisonné box; 18th century; cloisonné enamels on copper with gilt bronze; 20.5 × 19.8 cm; Walters Art Museum (Baltimore, Maryland, US)

=== Japanese ===
Japanese art covers a wide range of art styles and media, including ancient pottery, sculpture, ink painting and calligraphy on silk and paper, ukiyo-e paintings and woodblock prints, ceramics, origami, and more recently manga—modern Japanese cartooning and comics—along with a myriad of other types.

The first settlers of Japan were the Jōmon people (c. 11,000–300 BC). They crafted lavishly decorated pottery storage vessels, clay figurines called dogū. Japan has been subject to sudden invasions of new ideas followed by long periods of minimal contact with the outside world. Over time the Japanese developed the ability to absorb, imitate, and finally assimilate those elements of foreign culture that complemented their aesthetic preferences. The earliest complex art in Japan was produced in the 7th and 8th centuries in connection with Buddhism. In the 9th century, as the Japanese began to turn away from China and develop indigenous forms of expression, the secular arts became increasingly important; until the late 15th century, both religious and secular arts flourished. After the Ōnin War (1467–1477), Japan entered a period of political, social, and economic disruption that lasted for over a century. In the state that emerged under the leadership of the Tokugawa shogunate, organized religion played a much less important role in people's lives, and the arts that survived were primarily secular.

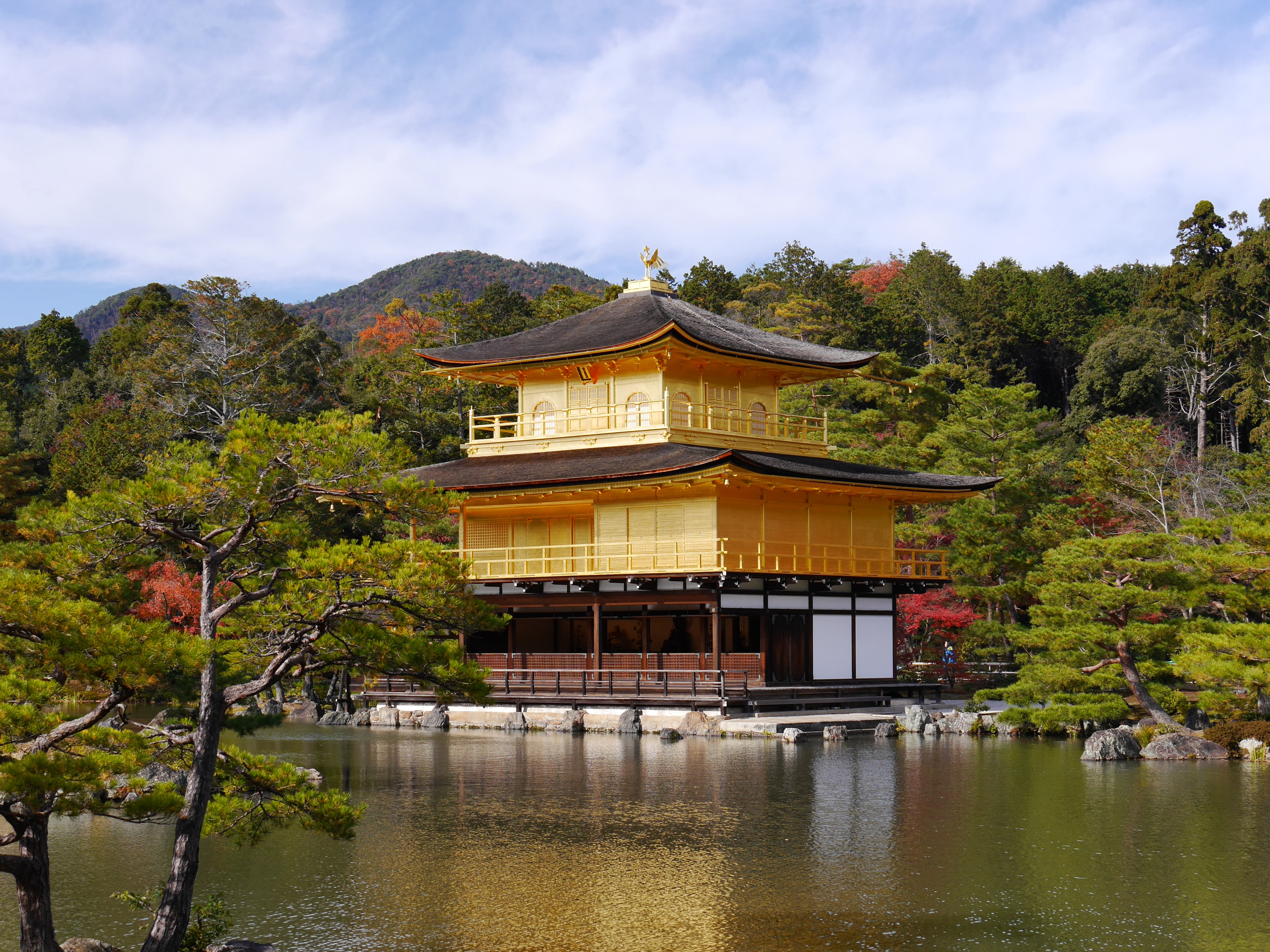
Temple of the Golden Pavilion (Kitayama, Kyoto), a Zen Buddhist temple in Kyoto, 1398

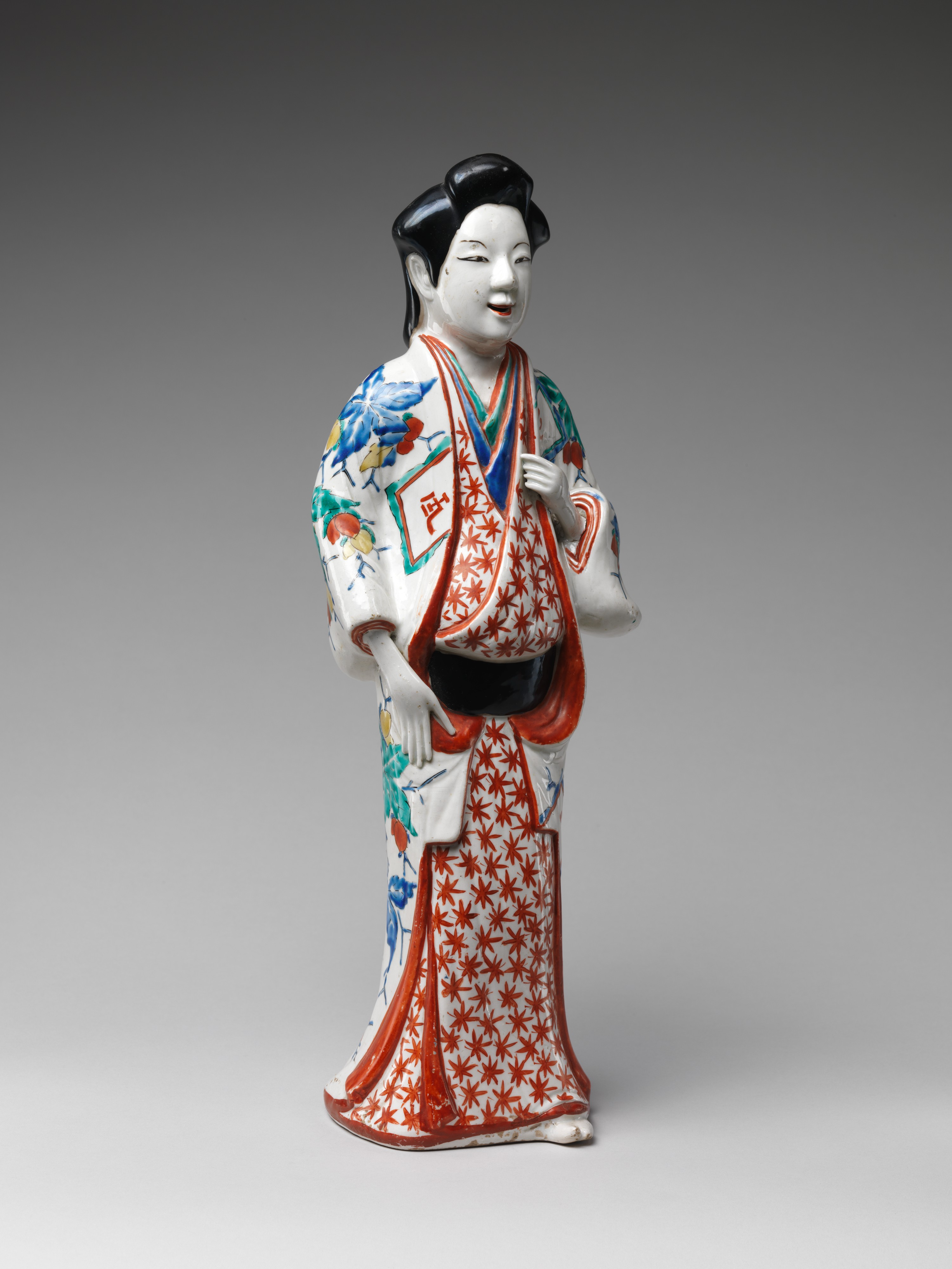
Female figure; c. 1670–1690; porcelain with overglaze polychrome enamels; height: 39.7 cm; Metropolitan Museum of Art (New York City)

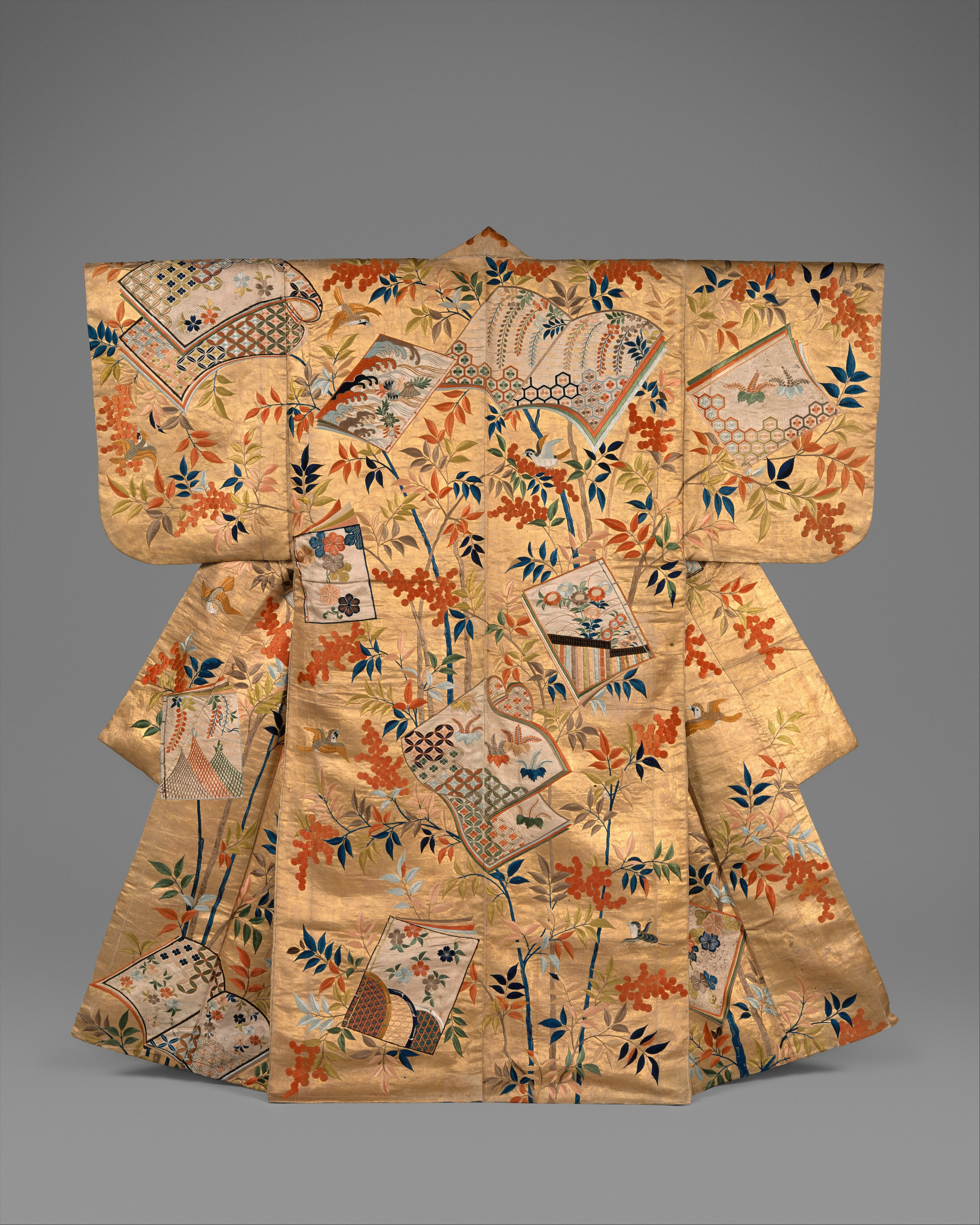
Noh robe; 1750–1800; silk embroidery and gold leaf on silk satin; length: 1.66 m; Metropolitan Museum of Art

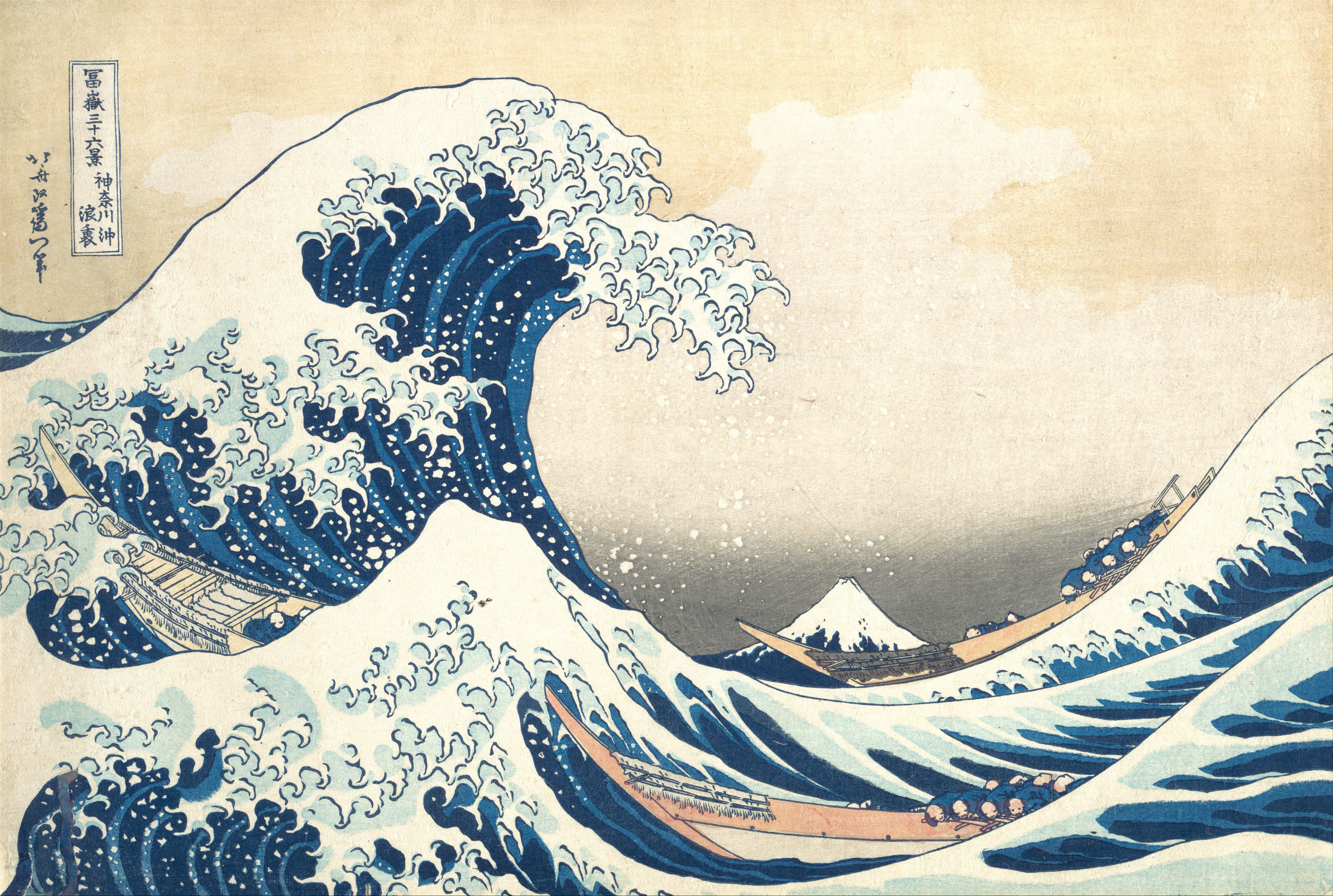
The Great Wave off Kanagawa, by Katsushika Hokusai; c. 1830–1832; full-colour woodblock print; 25.7 x 37.9 cm; Metropolitan Museum of Art

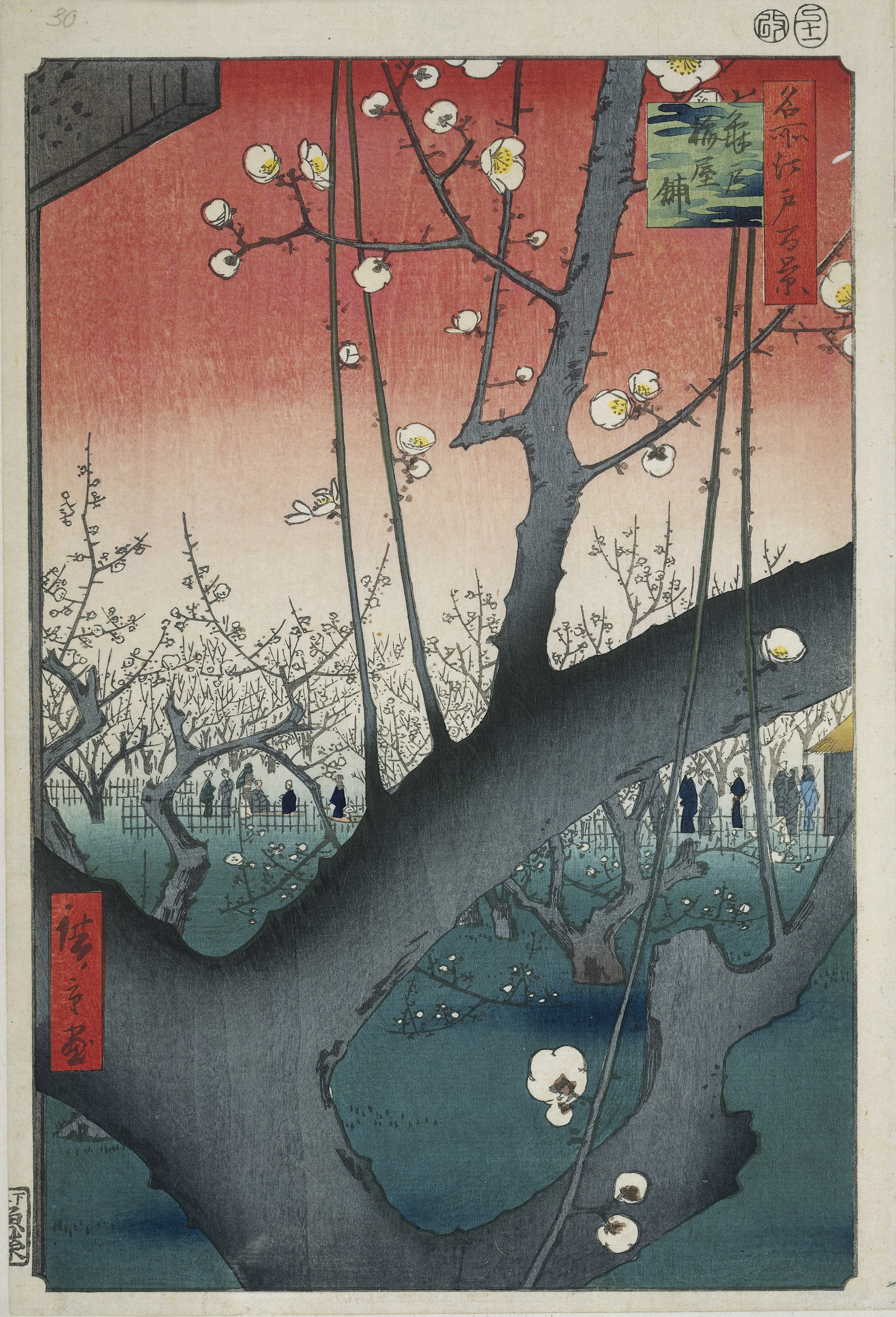
Plum Park in Kameido; by Hiroshige; 1857; full-colour woodblock print; 36.4 x 24.4 cm; Rijksmuseum (Amsterdam, the Netherlands)

== Sub-Saharan Africa ==
Sub-Saharan African art includes both sculpture, typified by the brass castings of the Benin people, Igbo Ukwu and the Kingdom of Ifẹ, and terracottas of Djenne-Jeno, Ife, and the more ancient Nok culture, as well as folk art. Concurrent with the European Middle Ages, in the eleventh century AD a nation that made grand architecture, gold sculpture, and intricate jewelry was founded in Great Zimbabwe. Impressive sculpture was concurrently being cast from brass by the Yoruba people of what is now Nigeria. In the Benin Kingdom, also of southern Nigeria, which began around the same time, elegant altar tusks, brass heads, plaques of brass, and palatial architecture were created. The Benin Kingdom was ended by the British in 1897, and little of the culture's art now remains in Nigeria. Today, the most significant arts venue in Africa is the Johannesburg Biennale.

Sub-Saharan Africa is characterized by a high density of cultures. Notable are the, Dogon people from Mali; Edo, Yoruba, Igbo people and the Nok civilization from Nigeria; Kuba and Luba people from Central Africa; Ashanti people from Ghana; Zulu people from Southern Africa; and Fang people from Equatorial Guinea (85%), Cameroon and Gabon; the Sao civilization people from Chad; Kwele people from eastern Gabon, Republic of the Congo and Cameroon.

The myriad forms of African art are integral to the lives of African people. Created for specific purposes, artworks can reveal their ongoing importance through physical transformations that enhance both their appearance and their potency. Many traditional African art forms are created as conduits to the spirit world and change appearance as materials are added to enhance their beauty and potency. The more a work is used and blessed, the more abstract it becomes with the accretion of sacrificial matter and the wearing down of original details.

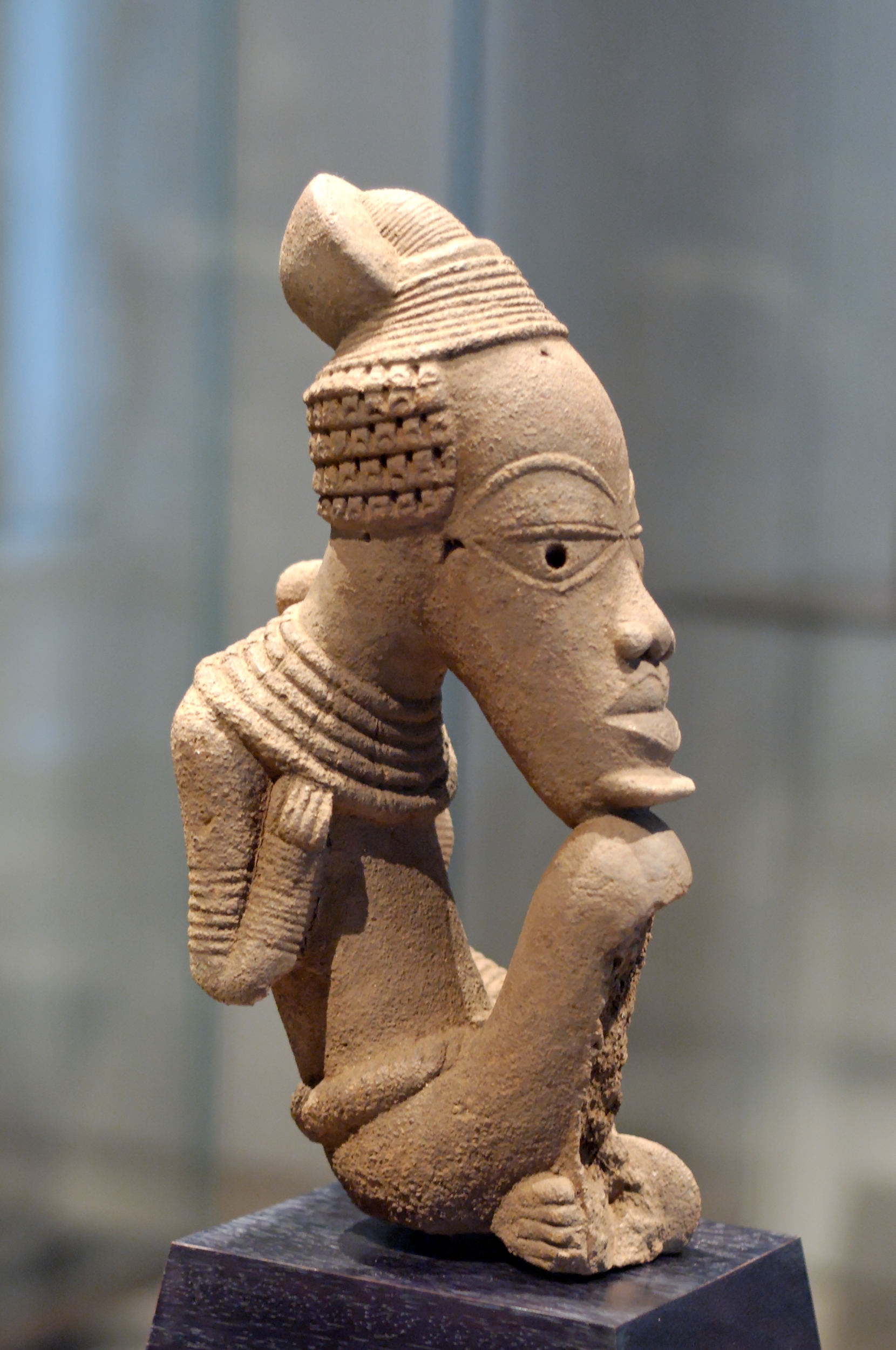
Seated figure; by artists of the Nok culture; 5th century BC-5th century AD; earthenware (central Nigeria); height: 38 cm; Musée du Quai Branly, Paris

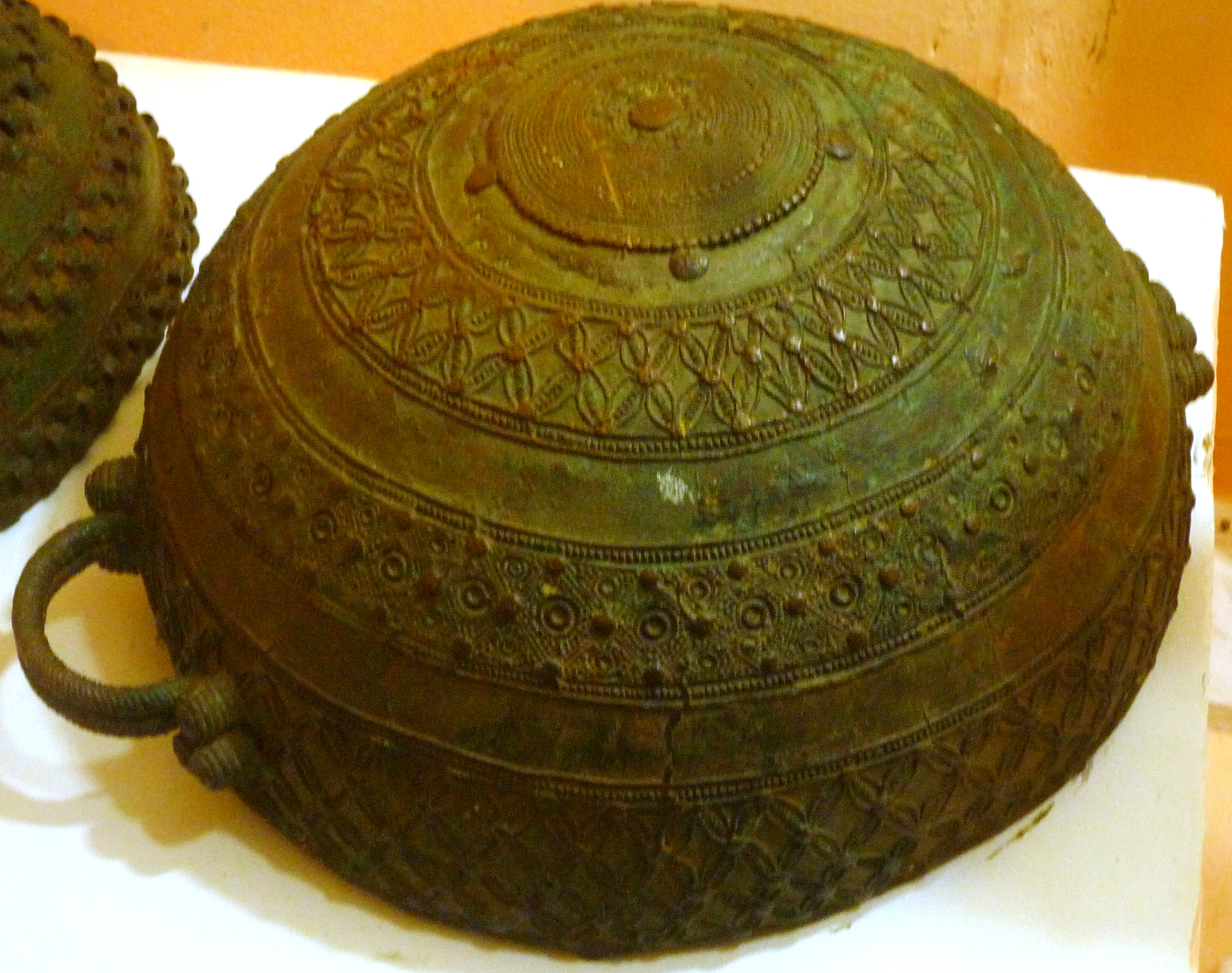
Pot; from Igbo-Ukwu (Nigeria); 9th century; bronze; unknown dimensions; Nigerian National Museum, Lagos

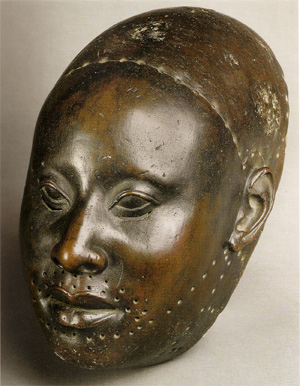
Bronze head sculpture of the Oni Obalufon, ca. 12th century, discovered at the holy city of the Yoruba Yoruba Ilé-Ifẹ̀; Nigerian National Museum, Lagos

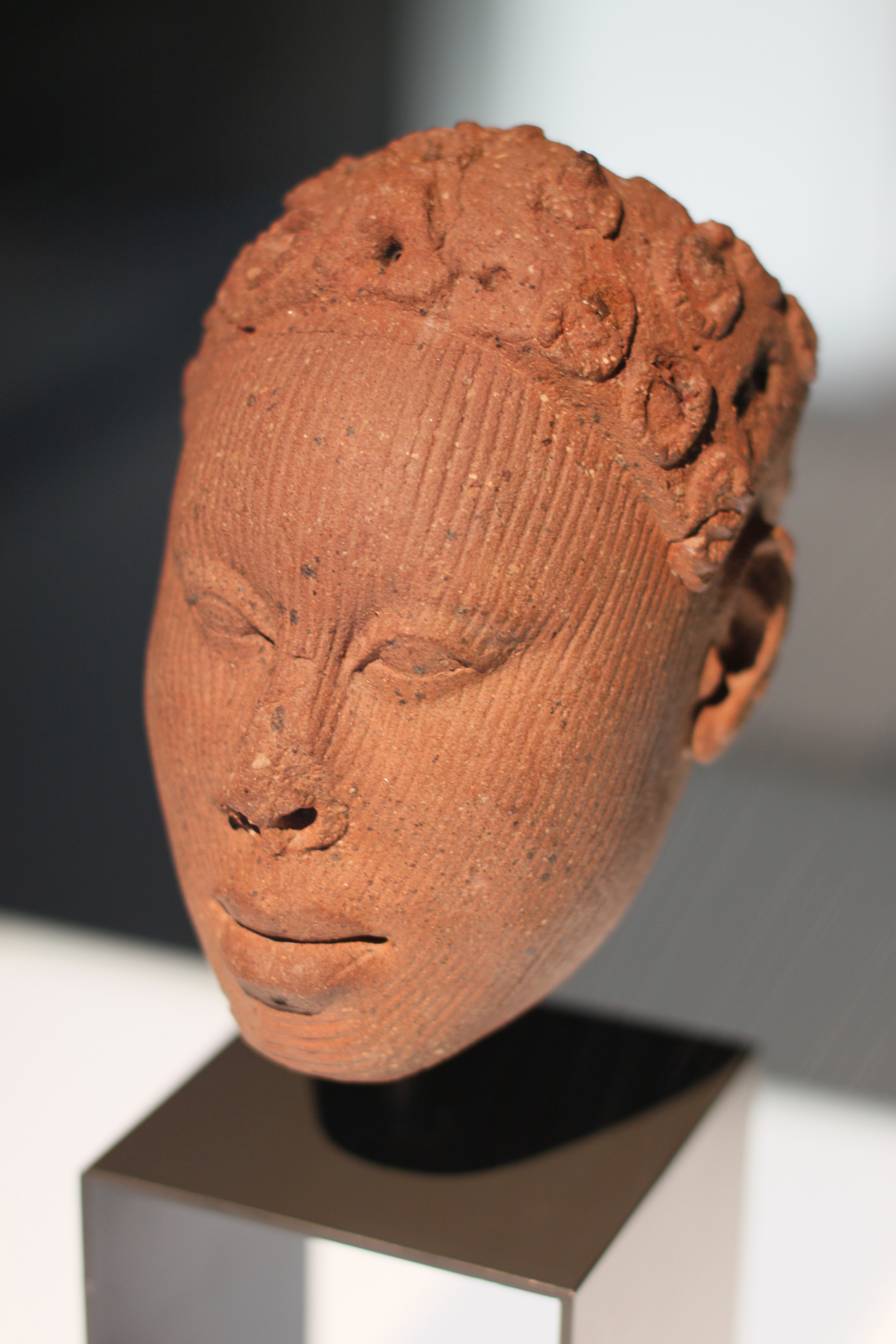
Head of a king or dignitary; by artists of the Yoruba people; 12th-15th century; terracotta; 19 cm; discovered at Ife (Nigeria); Ethnological Museum of Berlin, Germany

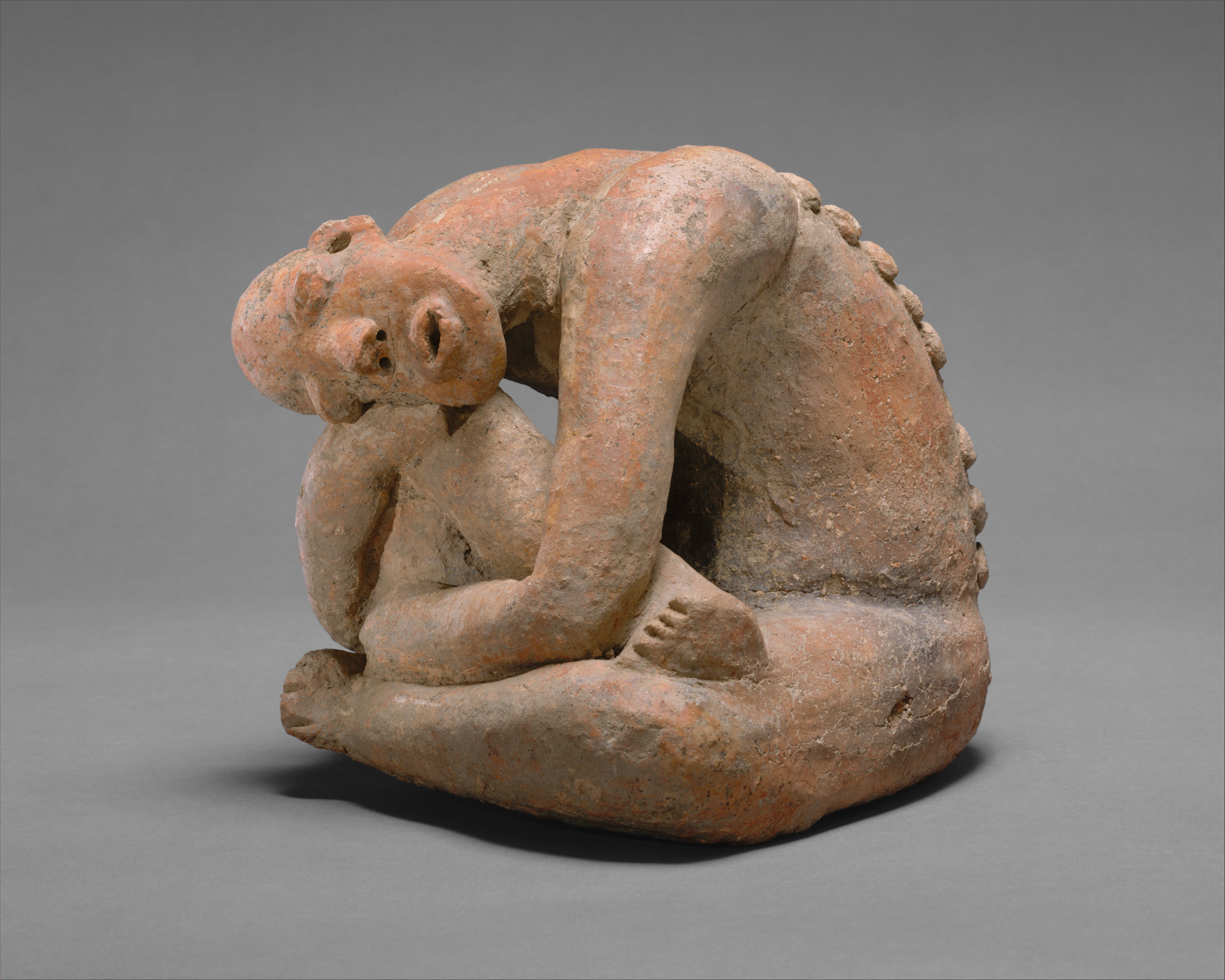
Seated figure; by artists of the Djenné-Djenno culture (Mali); 13th century; earthenware; width: 29.9 cm; Metropolitan Museum of Art, New York City

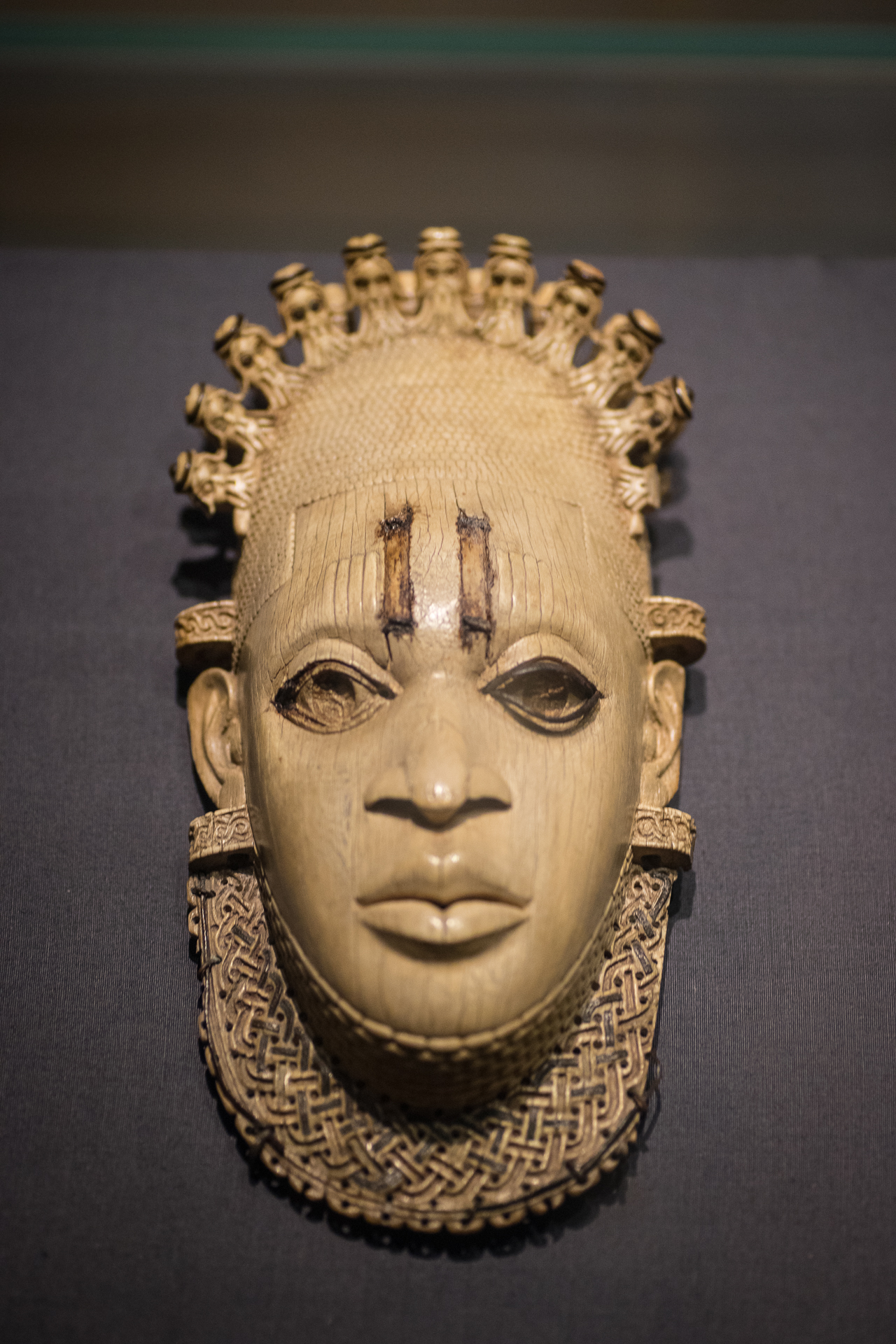
Pendant mask; by artists of the Edo people (Nigeria); 16th century (?); ivory and iron; height: 24.5 cm; British Museum, London

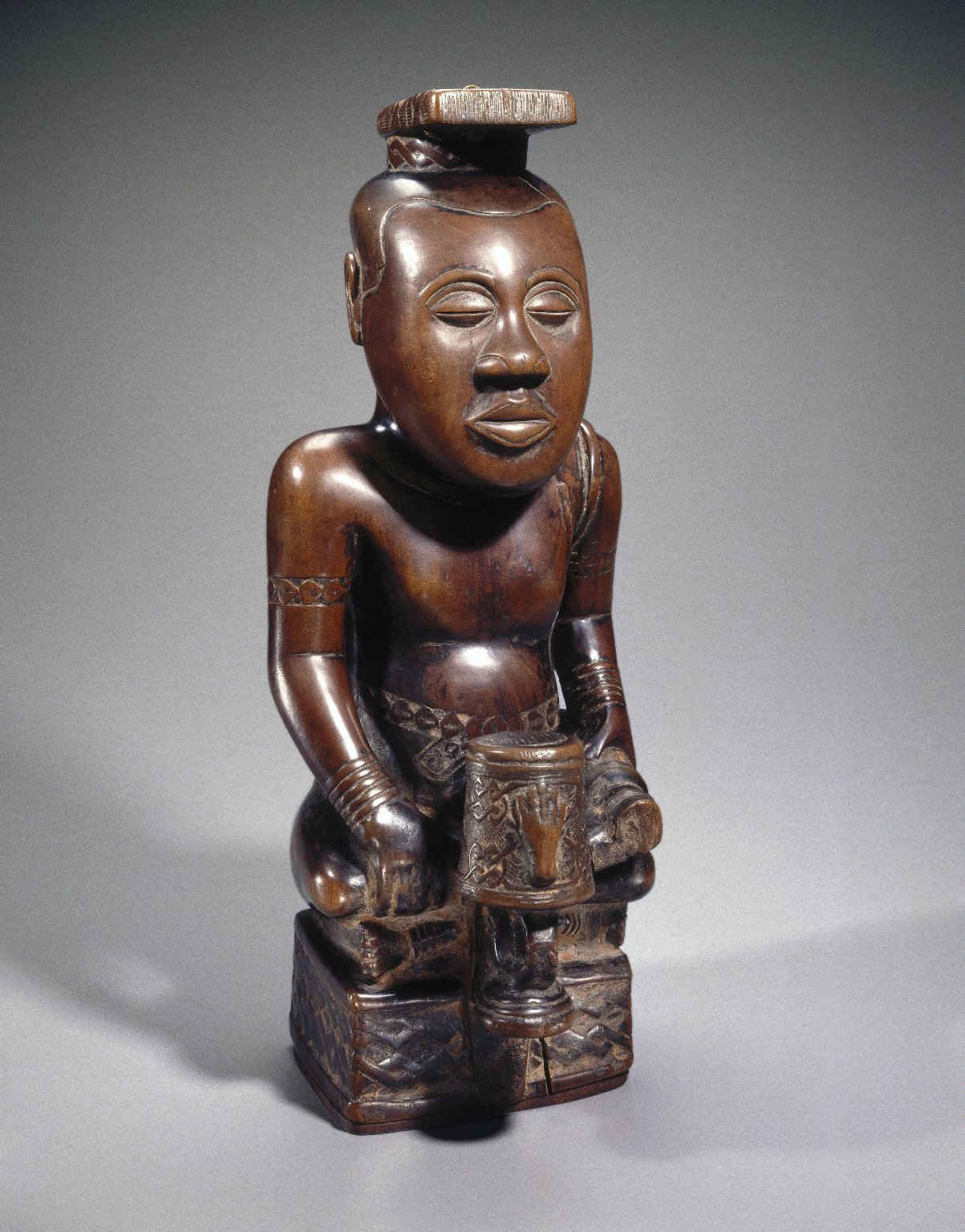
N'dop, king Mishe miShyaang maMbul; by artists of the Kuba Kingdom (Democratic Republic of the Congo); 18th century; wood; 49.5 cm; Brooklyn Museum, New York City

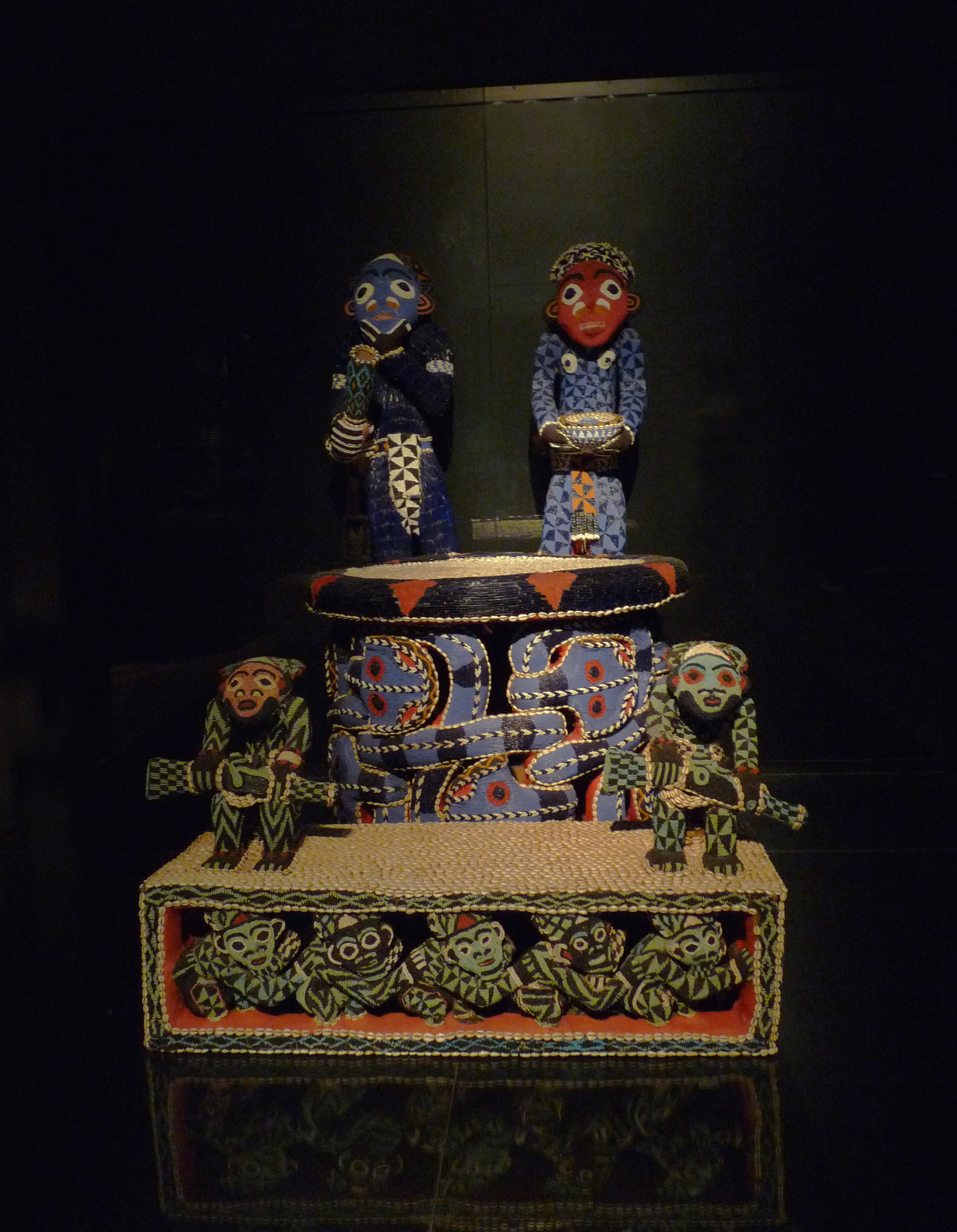
Mandu Yenu (throne of Nsangu); by artists of the Kingdom of Bamun; c.1870; wood, beads of glass, porcelain and shell; height: 1.75 m; Ethnological Museum of Berlin

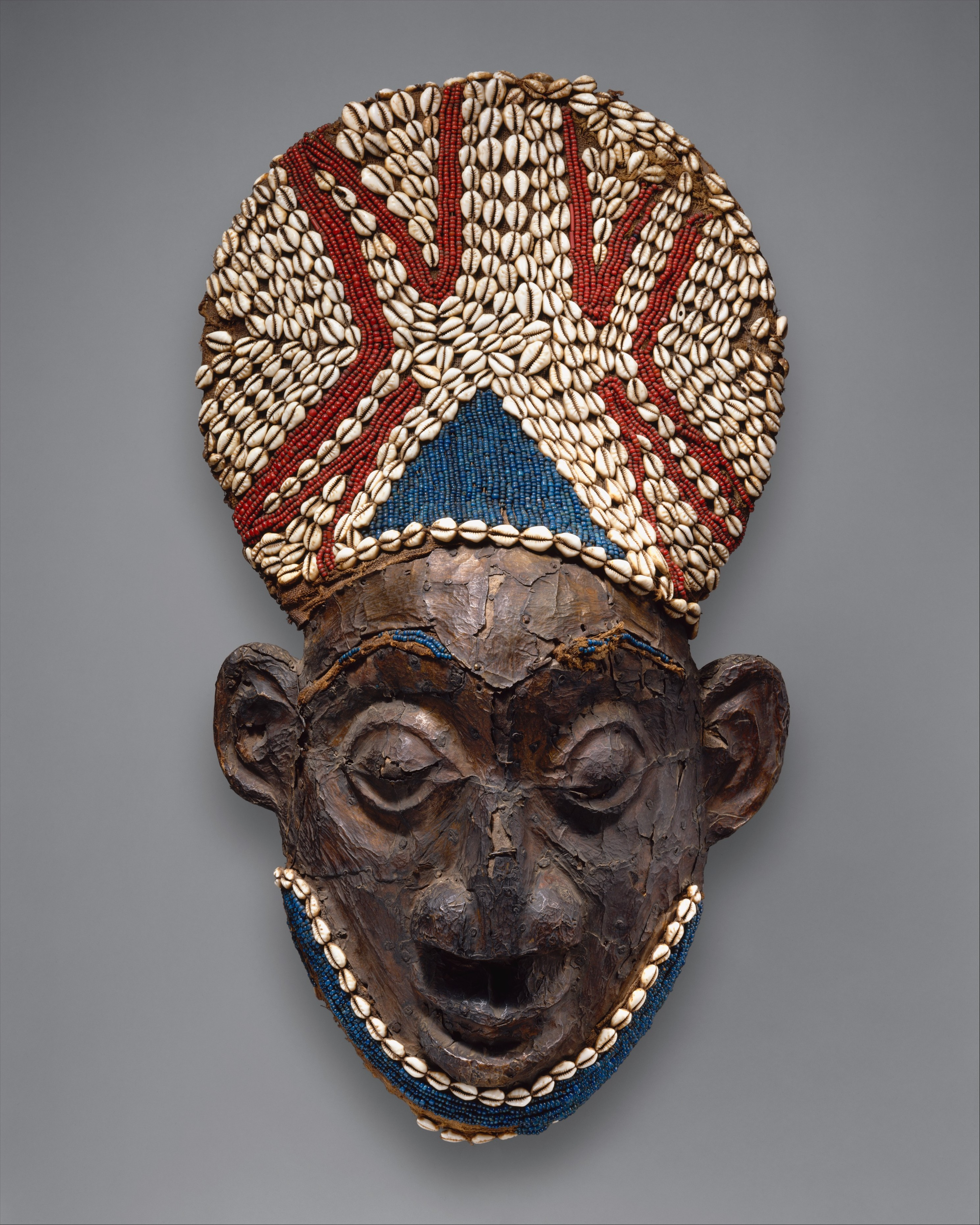
Royal mask; by artists of the Bamum people (Cameroon); before 1880; wood, copper, glass beads, raffia and shells; height: 66 cm; Metropolitan Museum of Art

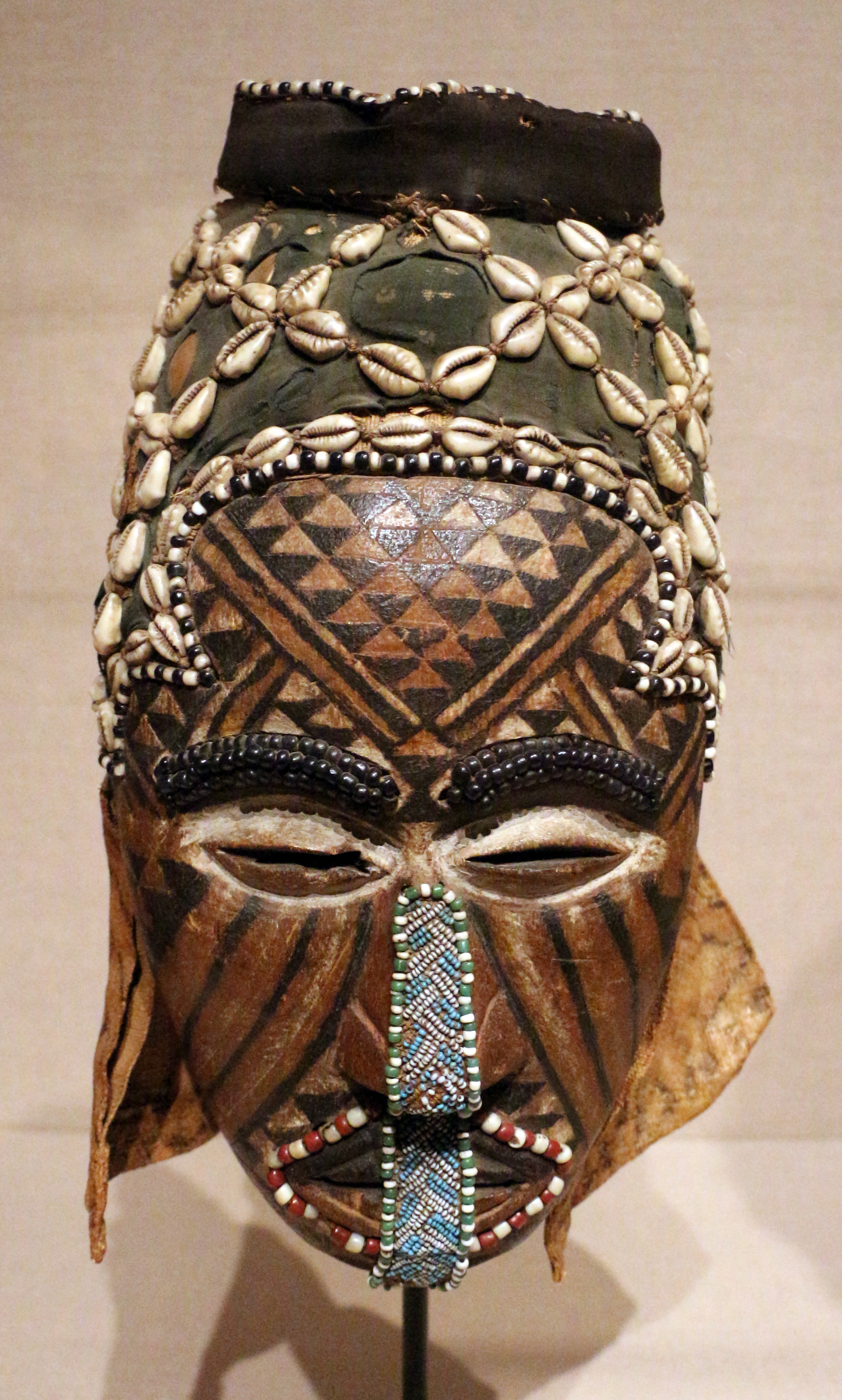
Ngaad-A-Mwash mask; by artists of the Kuba people; late 19th-early 20th centuries; wood, shells, glass beads, raffia and pigment; height: 82 cm; Detroit Institute of Arts, Detroit, Michigan, US

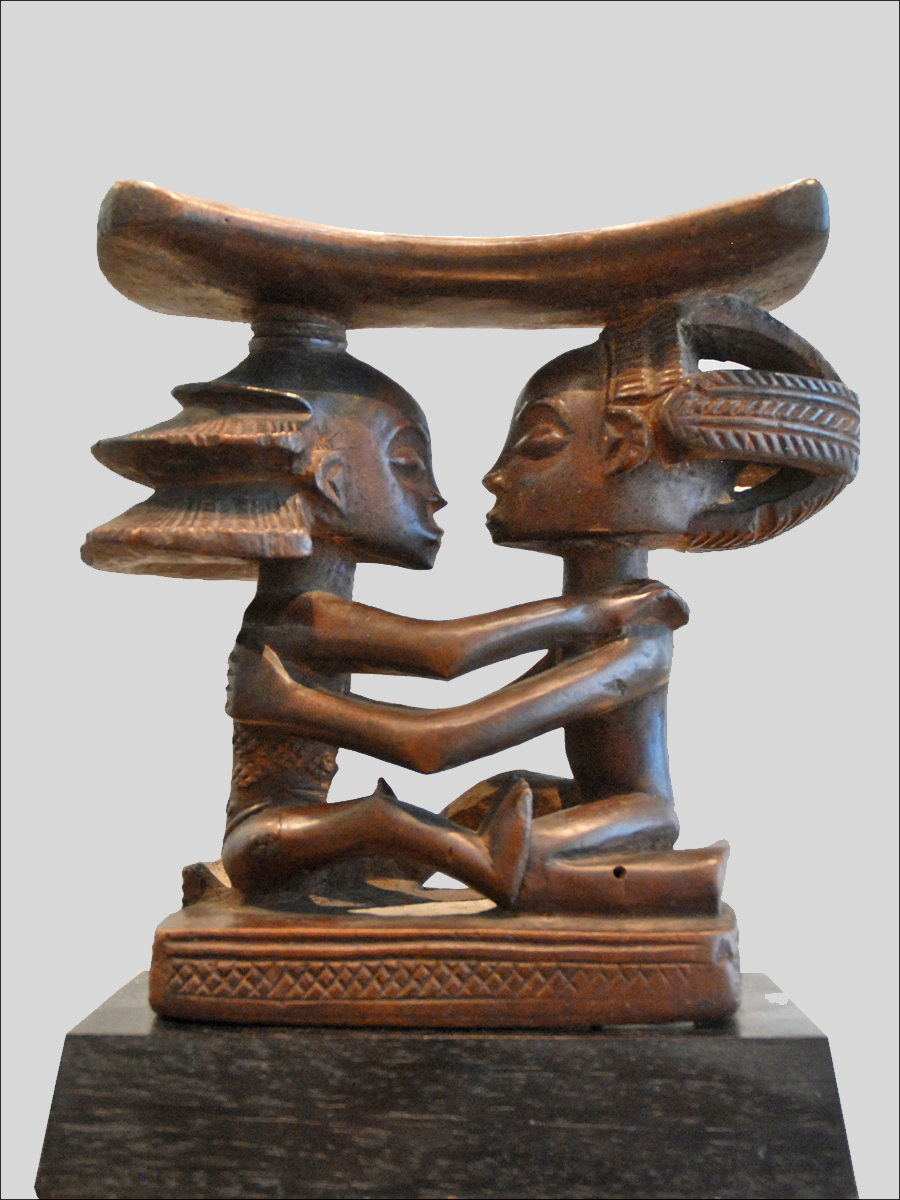
Headrest; by artists of the Luba people; 19th century; wood; height: 18.5 cm; Musée du quai Branly (Paris)

== Oceania ==
Oceanian art includes the geographic areas of Micronesia, Polynesia, Australia, New Zealand, and Melanesia. One approach treats the area thematically, with foci on ancestry, warfare, the body, gender, trade, religion, and tourism. Unfortunately, little ancient art survives from Oceania. Scholars believe that this is likely because artists used perishable materials, such as wood and feathers, which did not survive in the tropical climate, and there are no historical records to refer to most of this material. The understanding of Oceania's artistic cultures thus begins with the documentation of it by Westerners, such as Captain James Cook, in the 18th century. At the turn of the 20th century the French artist Paul Gauguin spent significant amounts of time in Tahiti, living with local people and making modern art — a fact that has become intertwined with Tahitian visual culture to the present day. The indigenous art of Australia often looks like abstract modern art, but it has deep roots in local culture.

The art of Oceania is the last great tradition of art to be appreciated by the world at large. Despite being one of the longest continuous traditions of art in the world, dating back at least fifty millennia, it remained relatively unknown until the second half of the 20th century.

The often ephemeral materials of Aboriginal art of Australia makes it difficult to determine the antiquity of the majority of the forms of art practised today. The most durable forms are the multitudes of rock engravings and rock paintings which are found across the continent. In the Arnhem Land escarpment, evidence suggests that paintings were being made fifty thousand years ago, antedating the Palaeolithic rock paintings of Altamira & Lascaux in Europe.

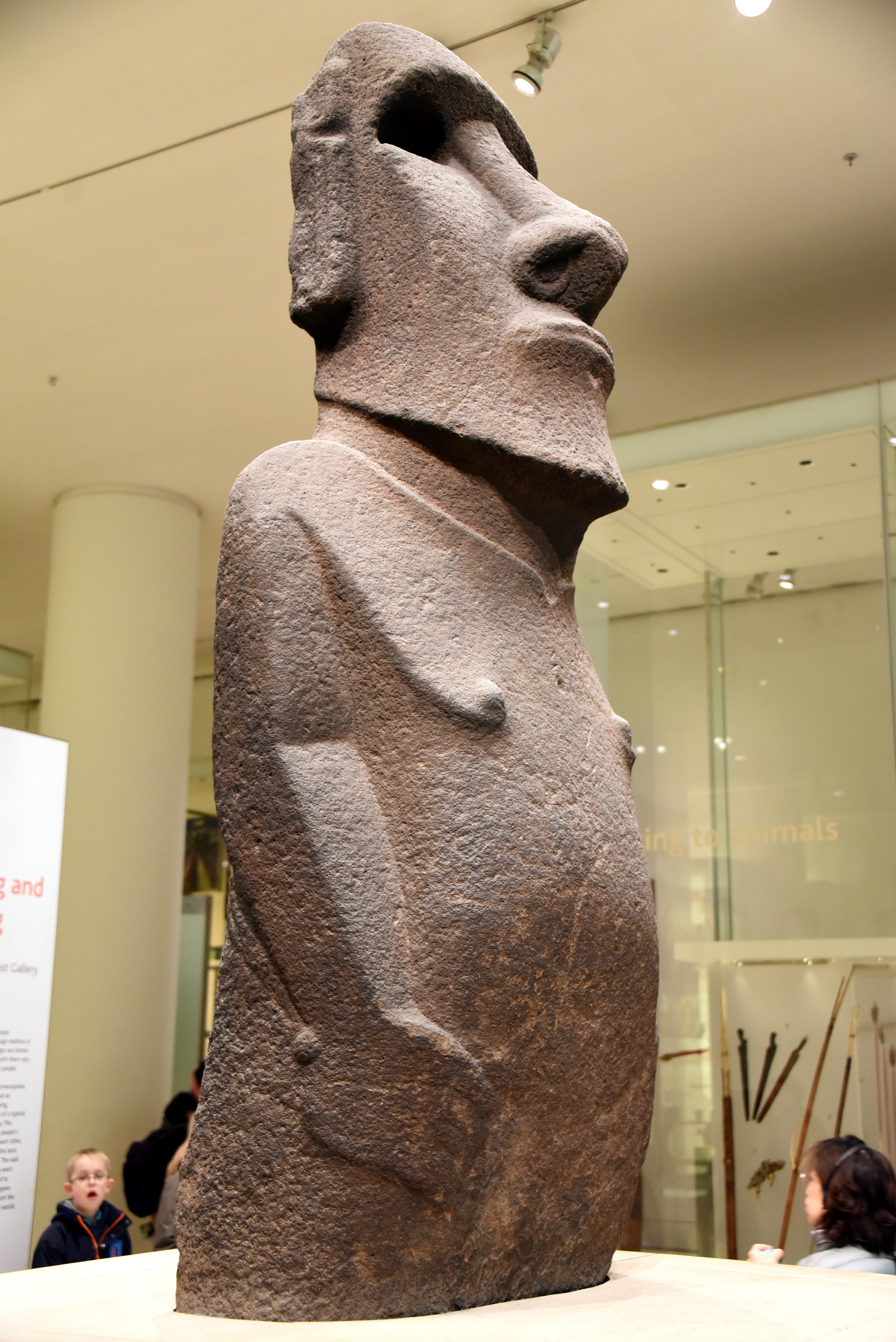
Hoa Hakananai'a, an example of a moai; c. 1200 AD; flow lava; height: 242 cm; British Museum (London)

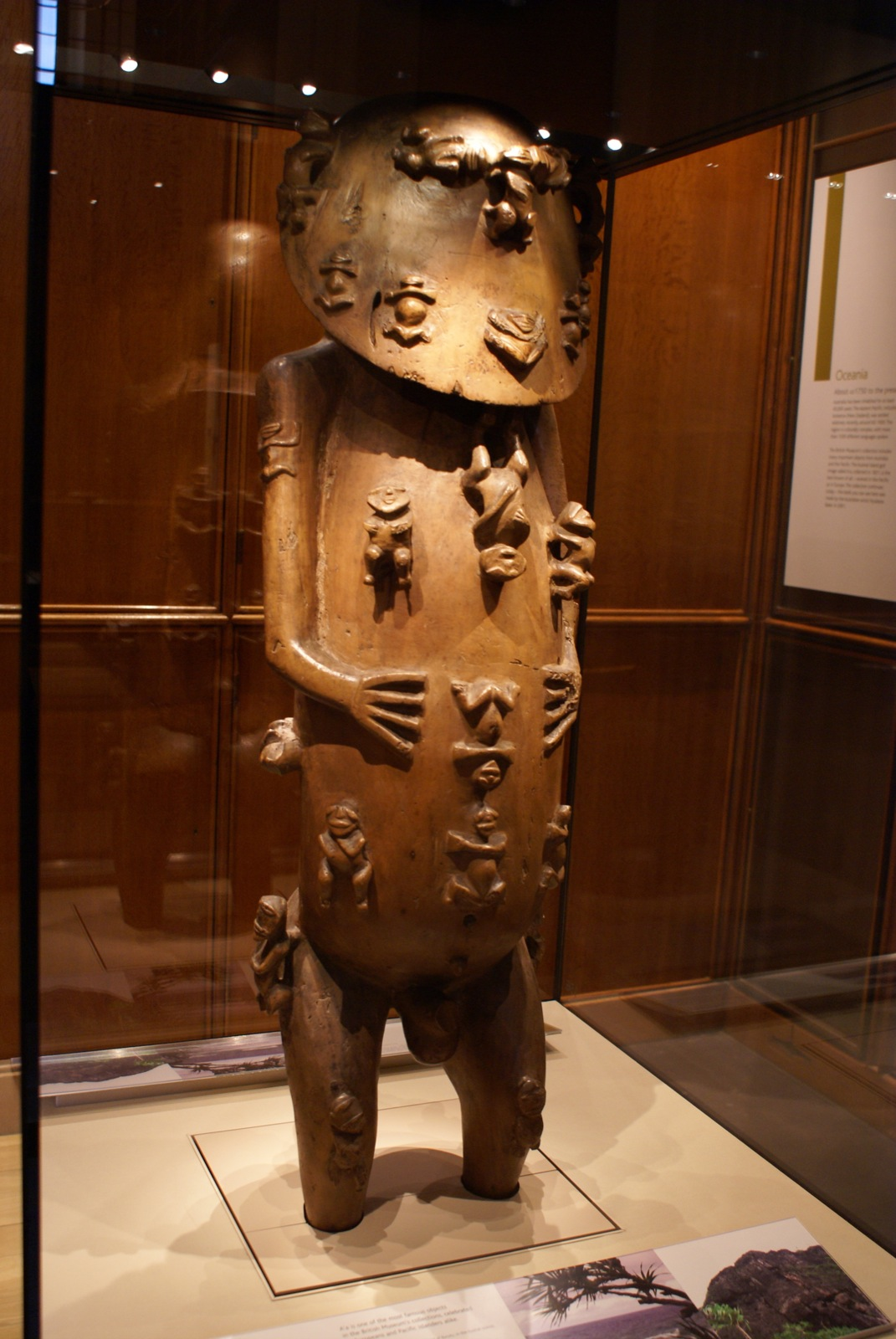
Statue of A'a from Rurutu; probably 18th century; wood; height: 117 cm; British Museum

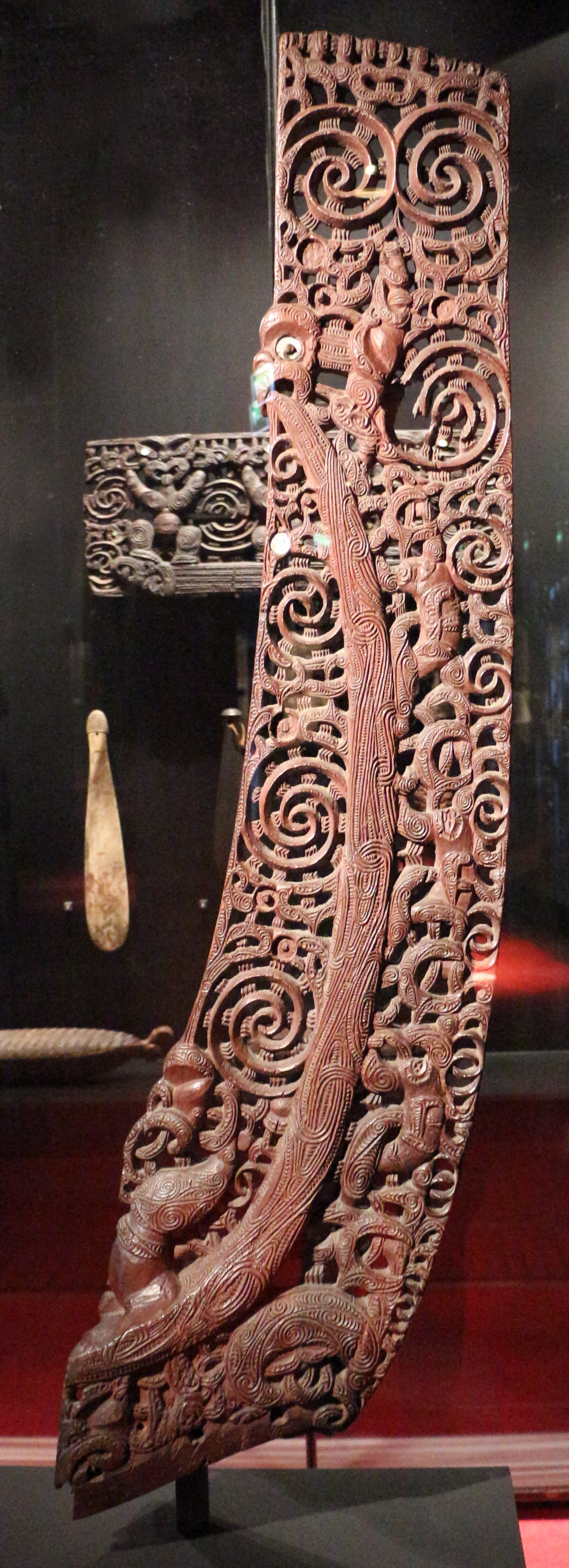
Taurapa (māori canoe sternpost); late 18th-early 19th century; wood and sheel; height: 148 cm; Musée du Quai Branly (Paris)

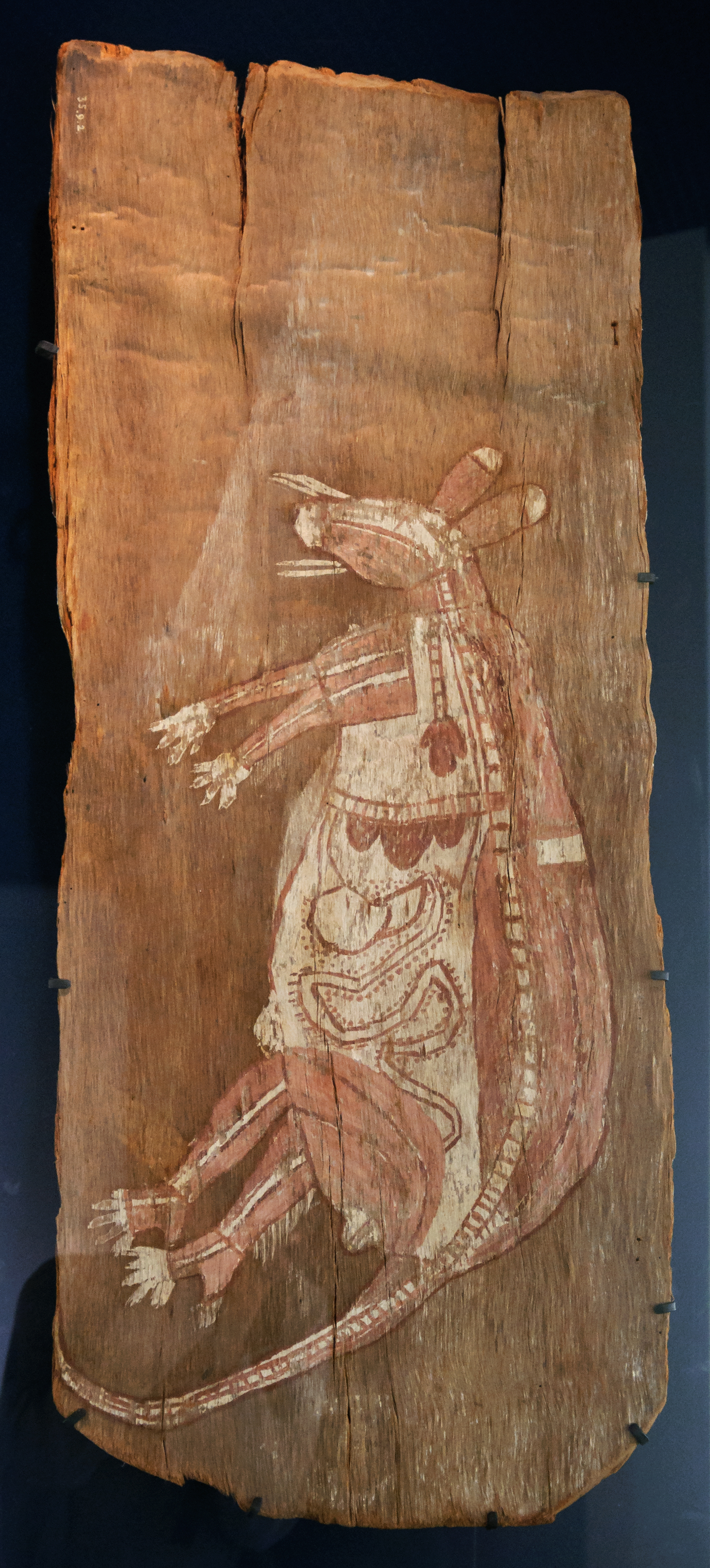
Australian painting of a kangaroo totemic ancestor; c. 1915; painting on bark; 92.5 × 35.5 cm; Musée du Quai Branly

== European ==
=== Medieval ===
With the decline of the Roman Empire from c. 300 AD, a period subsequently defined as the Medieval era began. It lasted for about a millennium, until the beginning of the Renaissance c. 1400. Early Christian art typifies the early stages of this period, followed by Byzantine art, Anglo-Saxon art, Viking art, Ottonian art, Romanesque art and Gothic art, with Islamic art dominating the eastern Mediterranean. Medieval art grew out of the artistic heritage of the Roman Empire and of Byzantium, mixed with the "barbarian" artistic culture of northern Europe.

In Byzantine and Gothic art of the Middle Ages, the dominance of the church resulted in a large amount of religious art. There was extensive use of gold in paintings, which presented figures in simplified forms.

==== Byzantine ====
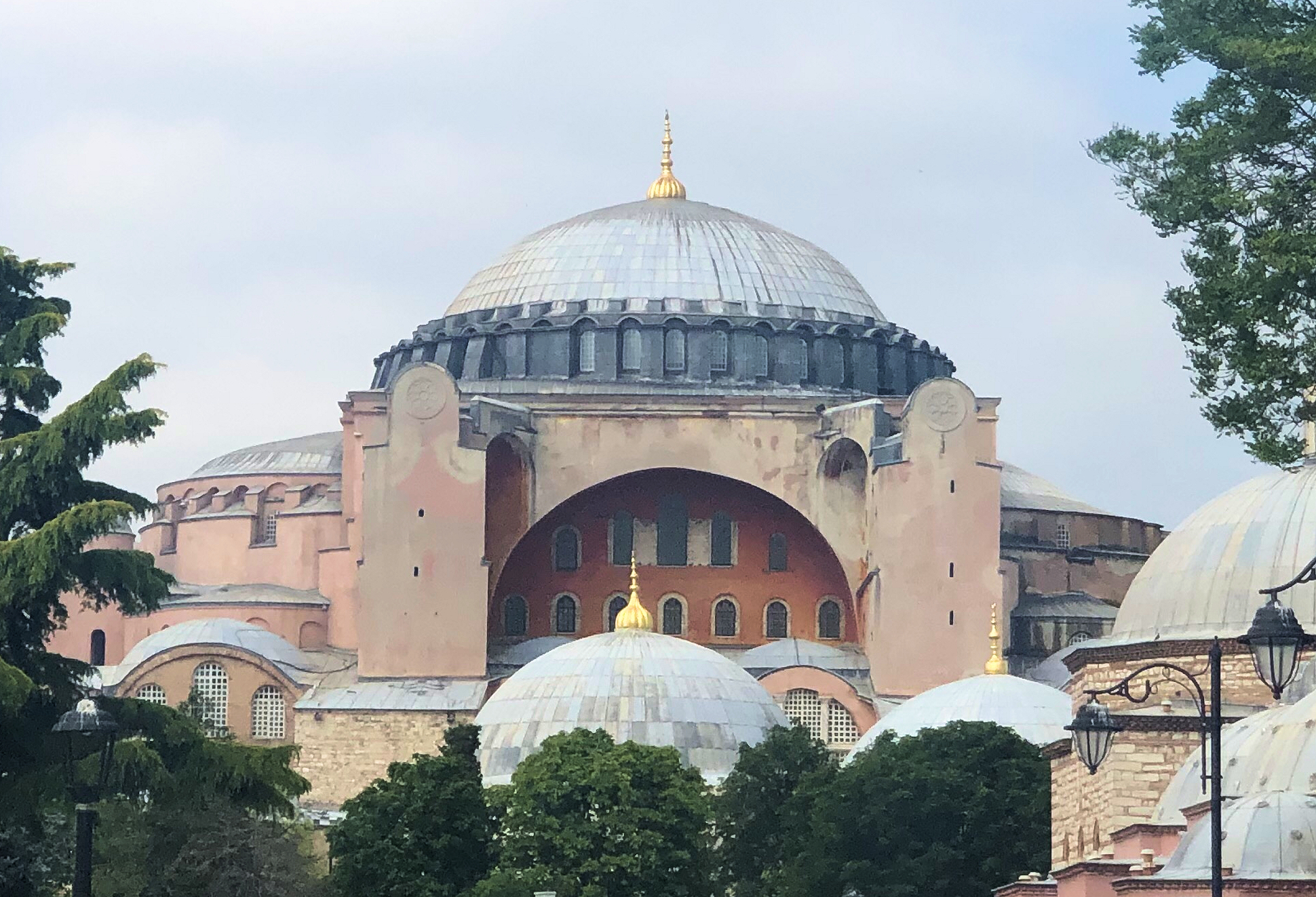
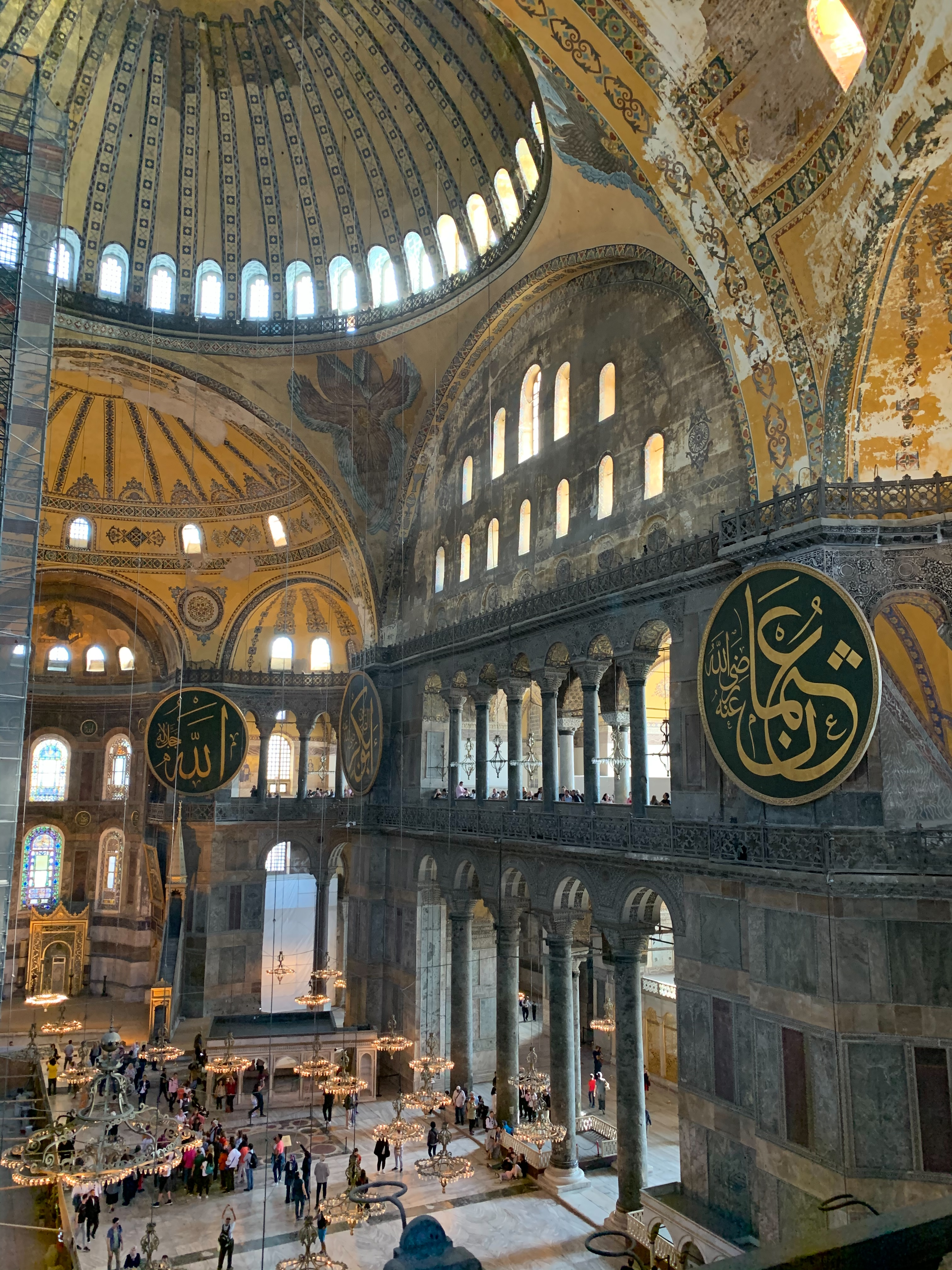
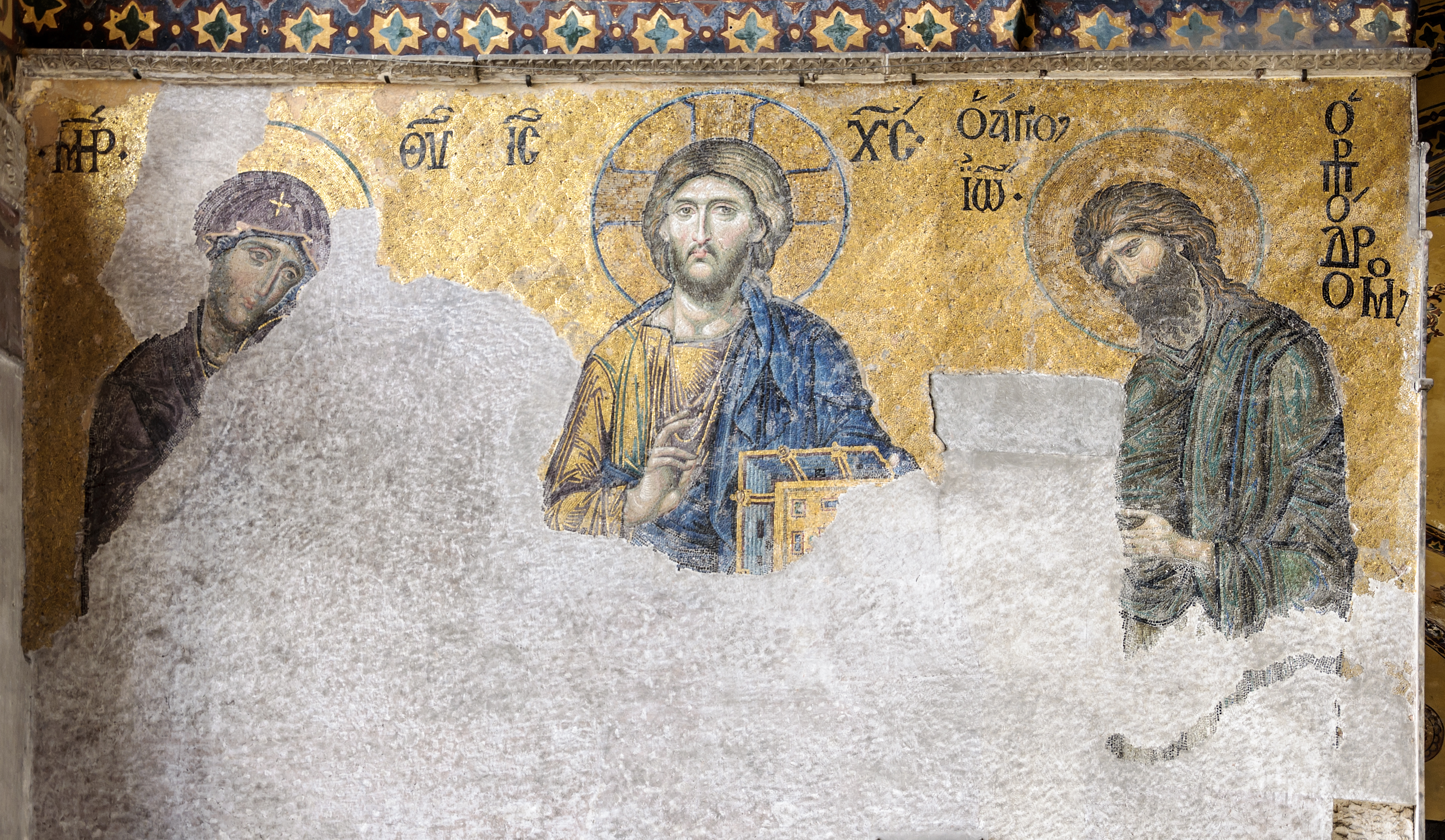
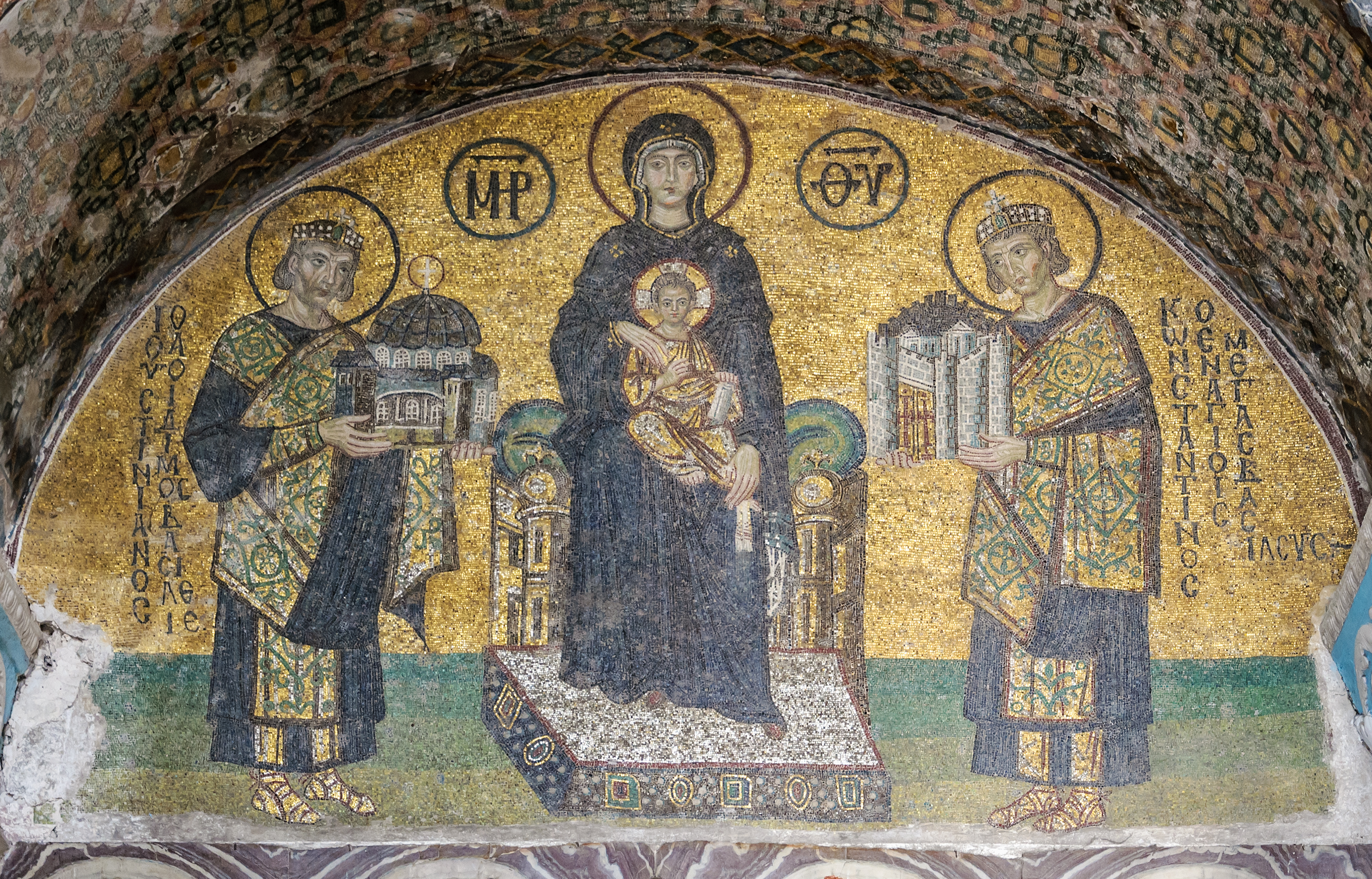
The Hagia Sophia (Istanbul, Turkey), c. 532–537 BC, by Anthemius of Tralles and Isidore of Miletus

Byzantine art consists of the body of Christian Greek artistic products of the Eastern Roman (Byzantine) Empire, as well as of the nations and states that inherited culturally from that empire. Though the Byzantine empire itself emerged from Rome's decline and lasted until the Fall of Constantinople in 1453, the start-date of the Byzantine period is rather clearer in art history than in political history, if still imprecise. Many Eastern Orthodox states in Eastern and Central Europe, as well as to some degree the Muslim states of the eastern Mediterranean, preserved many aspects of the empire's culture and art for centuries afterward.

Surviving Byzantine art is mostly religious, and—with exceptions at certain periods—is highly conventionalised, following traditional models that translate carefully controlled church theology into artistic terms. Painting in fresco, in illuminated manuscripts and on wood panels, and (especially in earlier periods) mosaic were the main media, and figurative sculpture occurred very rarely except for small carved ivories. Manuscript painting preserved to the end some of the classical realist tradition that was missing in larger works. Byzantine art was highly prestigious and sought after in Western Europe, where it maintained a continuous influence on medieval art until near the end of the medieval period. This was especially so in Italy, where Byzantine styles persisted in modified form through the 12th century, and became formative influences on Italian Renaissance art. But few incoming influences affected the Byzantine style. With the expansion of the Eastern Orthodox church, Byzantine forms and styles spread throughout the Orthodox world and beyond. Influences from Byzantine architecture, particularly in religious buildings, can be found in diverse regions from Egypt and Arabia to Russia and Romania.

Byzantine architecture is notorious for the use of domes. It also often featured marble columns, coffered ceilings and sumptuous decoration, including the extensive use of mosaics with golden backgrounds. The building material used by Byzantine architects was no longer marble, which the Ancient Greeks had appreciated so much. The Byzantines used mostly stone and brick, and also thin alabaster sheets for windows. Mosaics were used to cover brick walls, and any other surface where fresco wouldn't resist. Good examples of mosaics from the proto-Byzantine era are in Hagios Demetrios in Thessaloniki (Greece), the Basilica of Sant'Apollinare Nuovo and the Basilica of San Vitale (both in Ravenna in Italy), and in Hagia Sophia in Istanbul. Greco-Roman temples and Byzantine churches differ substantially in terms of their exterior and interior aspect. In Antiquity, the exterior was the most important part of the temple, because in the interior, which contained the cult statue of the deity to whom the temple was built, only the priest had access. Temple ceremonies in Antiquity took place outside, and what the worshippers viewed was the facade of the temple, consisting of columns, with an entablature and two pediments. In contrast, Christian liturgies played out in the interior of the churches, thus the exterior usually having little to no ornamentation.

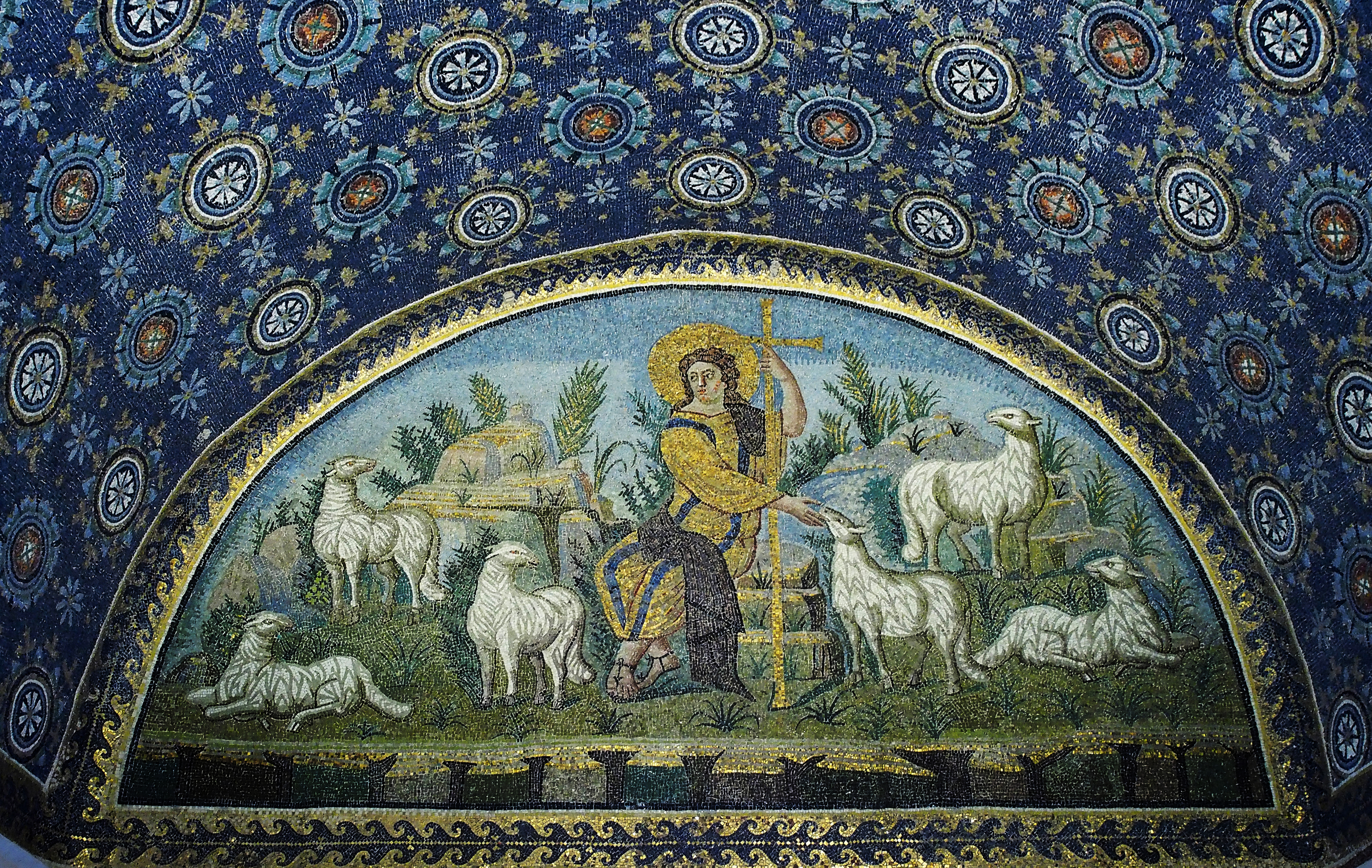
Christ as the Good Shepherd; c. 425–430; mosaic; width: c. 3 m; Mausoleum of Galla Placidia (Ravenna, Italy)

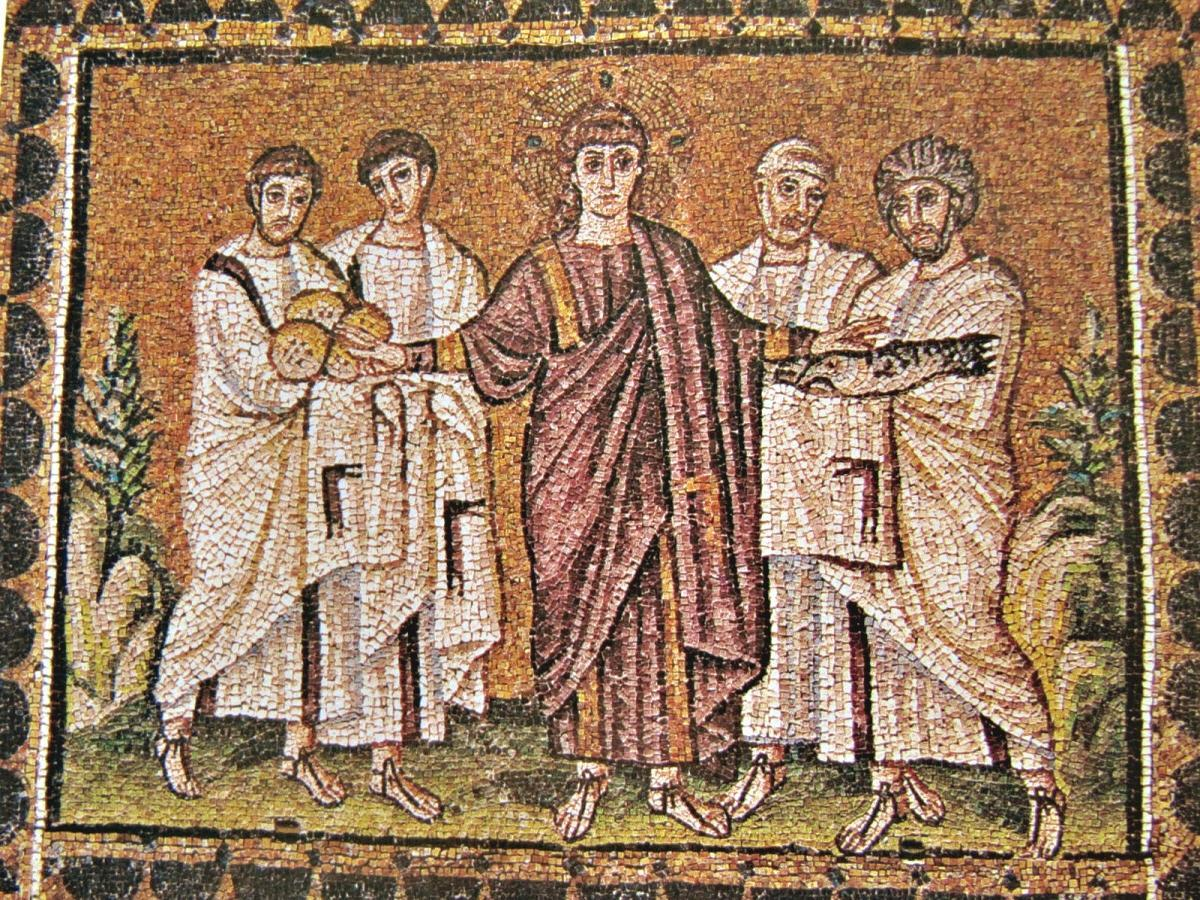
Feeding of the Five Thousand; c.520; mosaic; unknown dimensions; Basilica of Sant'Apollinare Nuovo, Ravenna, Italy

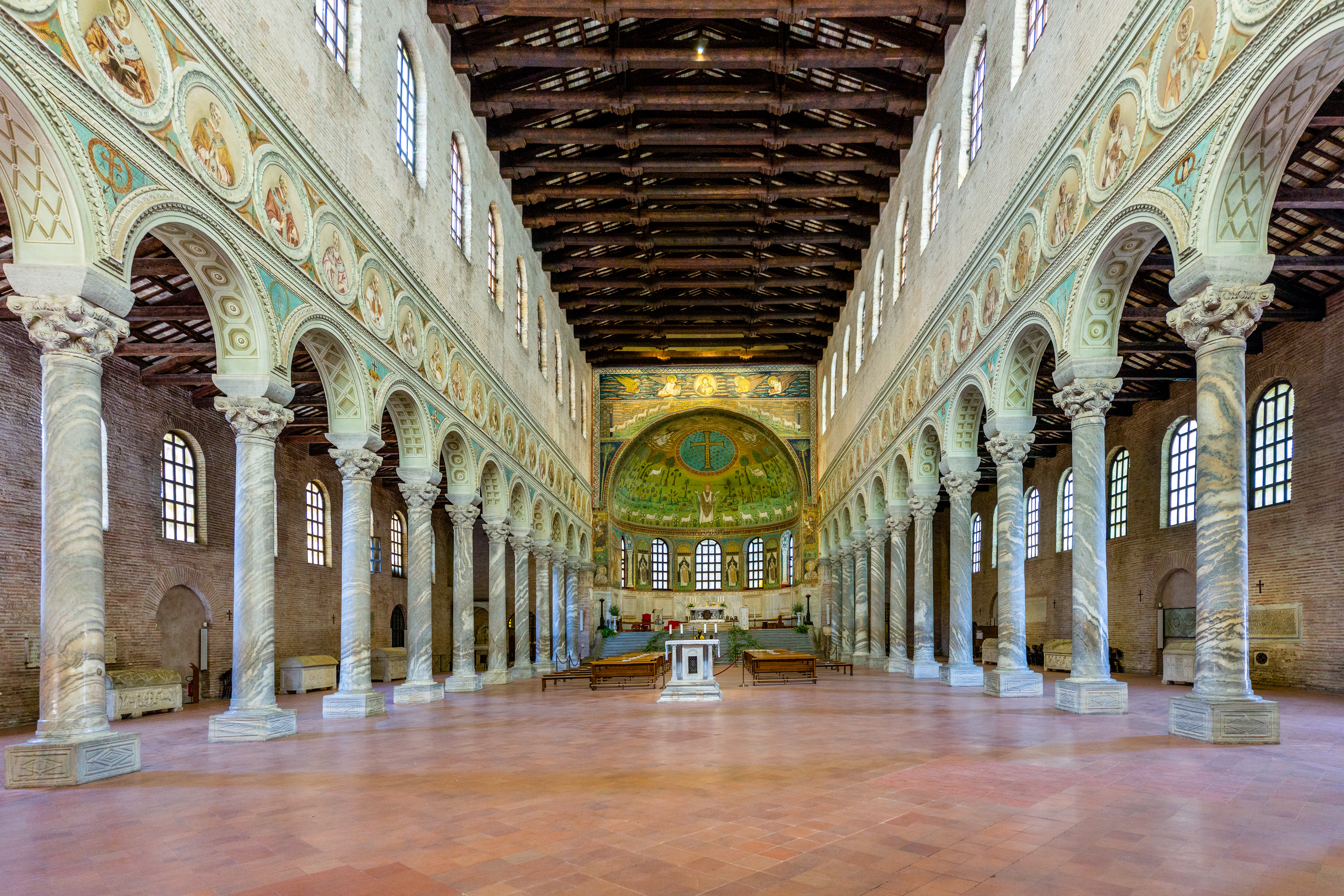
Basilica of Sant'Apollinare in Classe, Ravenna, unknown architect, c.530

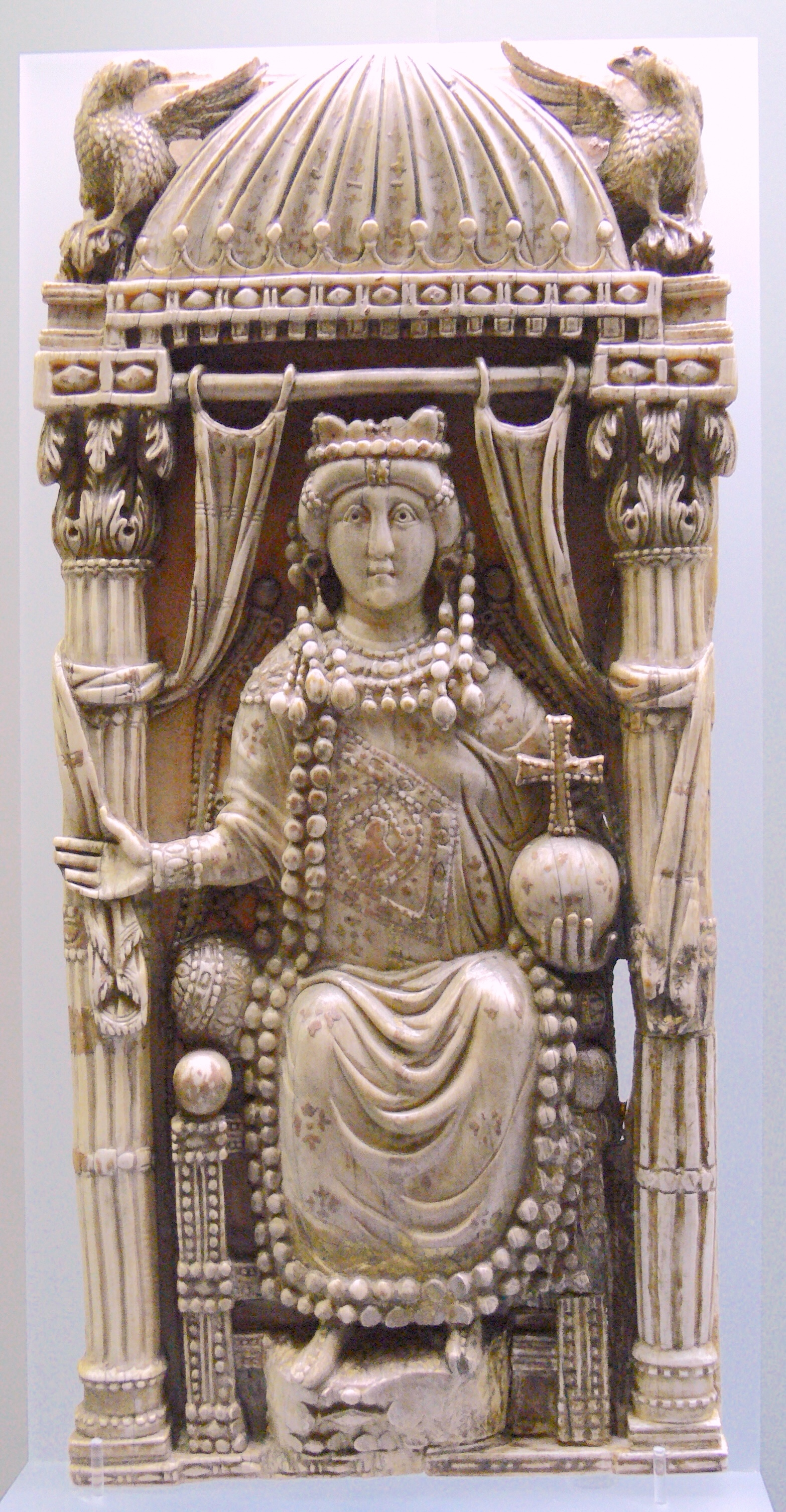
Diptych Leaf with a Byzantine Empress; 6th century; ivory with traces of gilding and leaf; height: 26.5 cm; Kunsthistorisches Museum (Vienna, Austria)

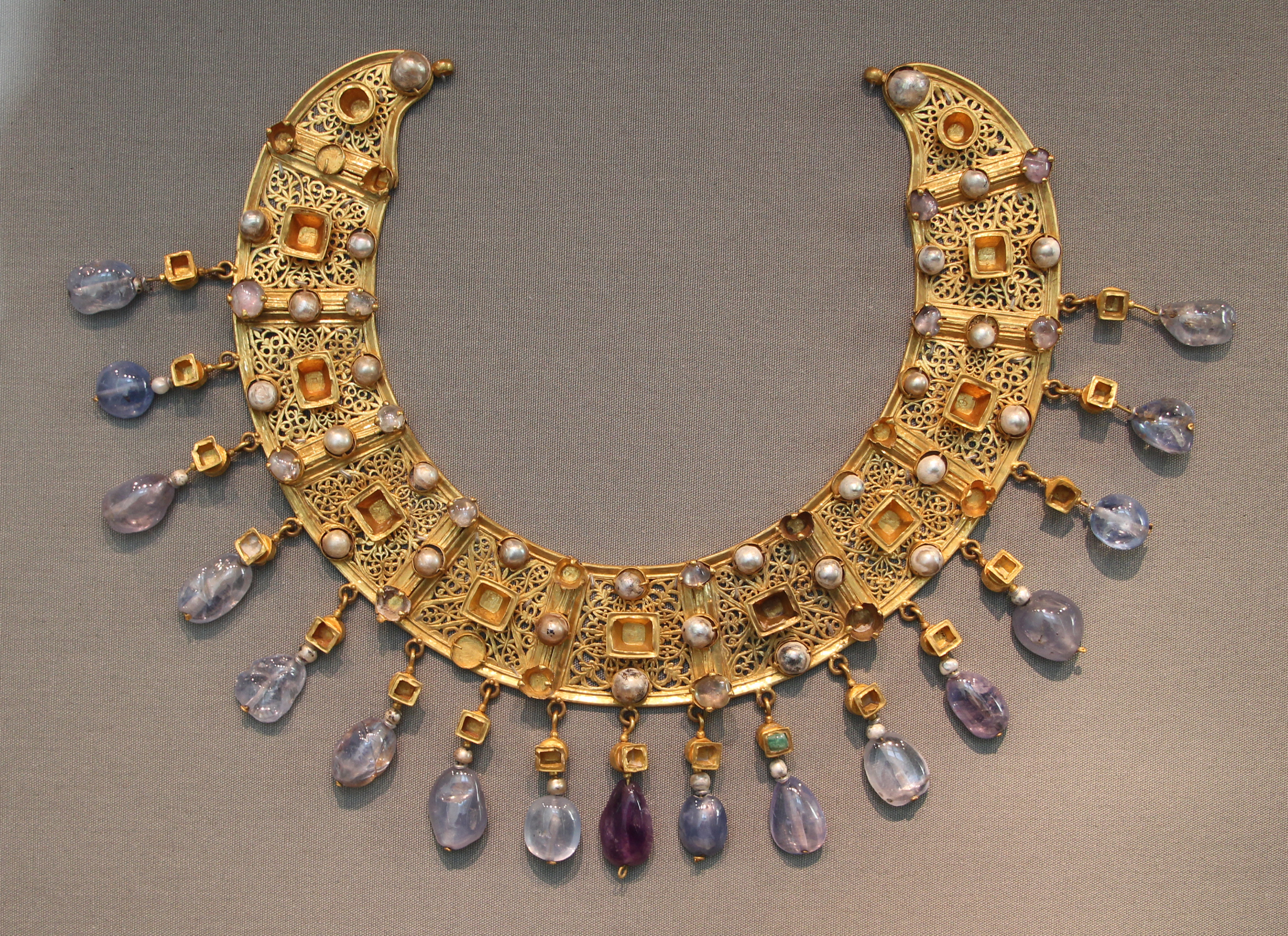
Collier; late 6th–7th century; gold, an emerald, a sapphire, amethysts and pearls; diameter: 23 cm; from a Constantinopolitan workshop; Antikensammlung Berlin (Berlin, Germany)

Page of the Gospel Book with Commentaries: Portrait of Mark; 1000–1100; ink, tempera, gold, vellum and leather binding; sheet: 28 × 23 cm; Cleveland Museum of Art (Cleveland, Ohio, US)

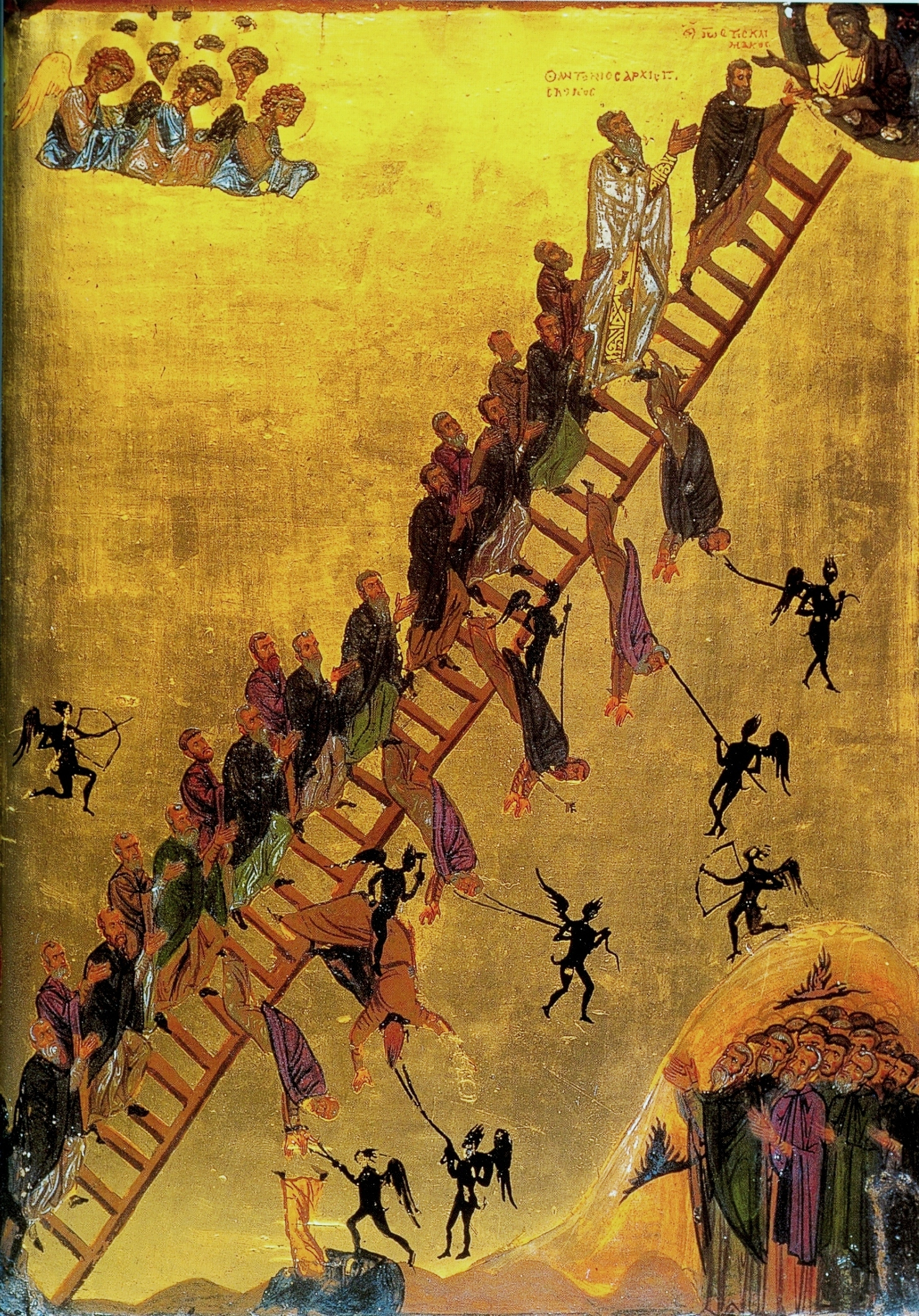
Ladder of Divine Ascent; late 12th century; tempera and gold leaf on panel; 41 x 29.5 cm; Saint Catherine's Monastery (Sinai Peninsula, Egypt)

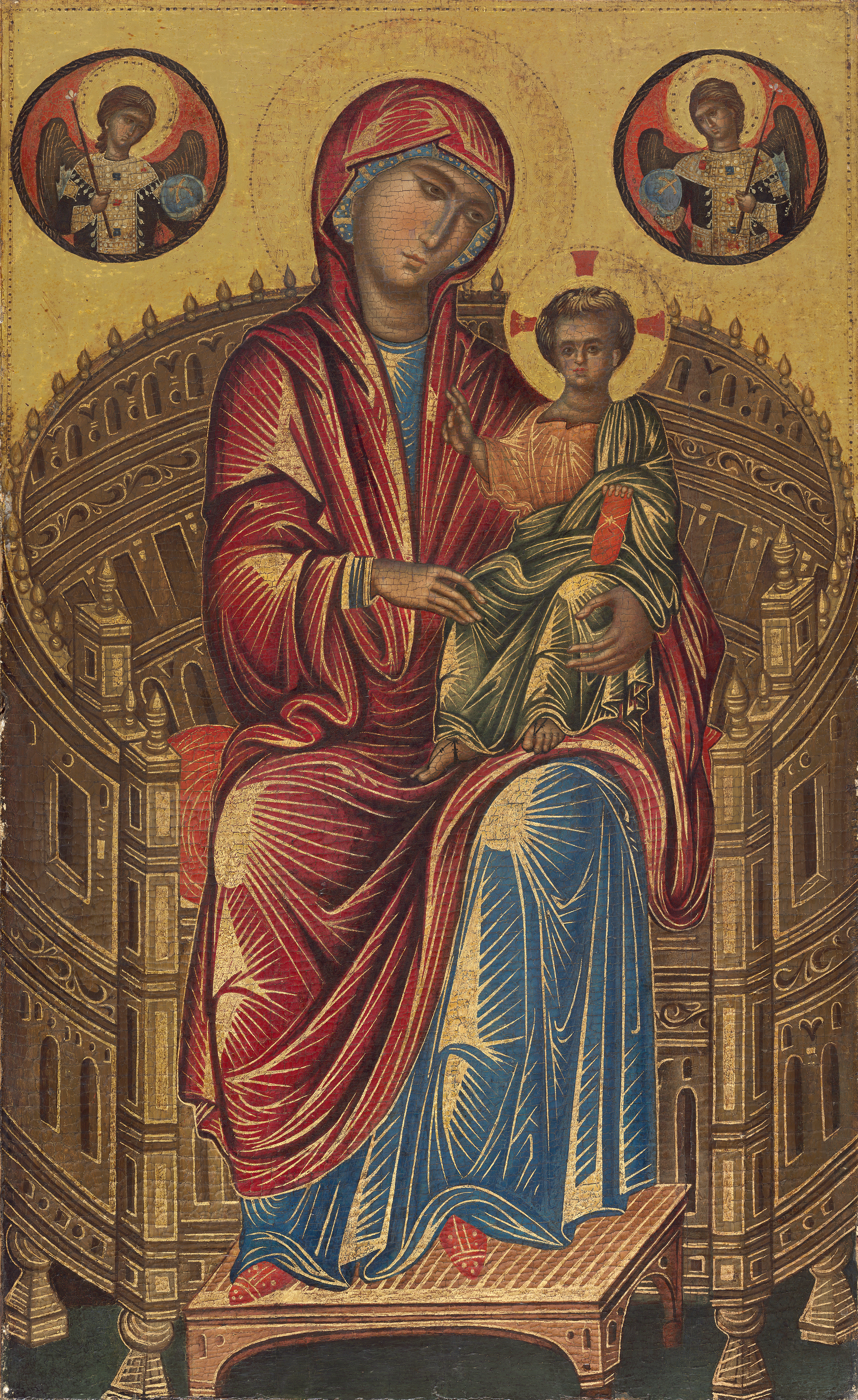
Madonna and Child on a Curved Throne; c.1280; tempera on panel; 81.5 x 49 cm; National Gallery of Art, Washington, D.C.

==== Carolingian and Ottonian ====
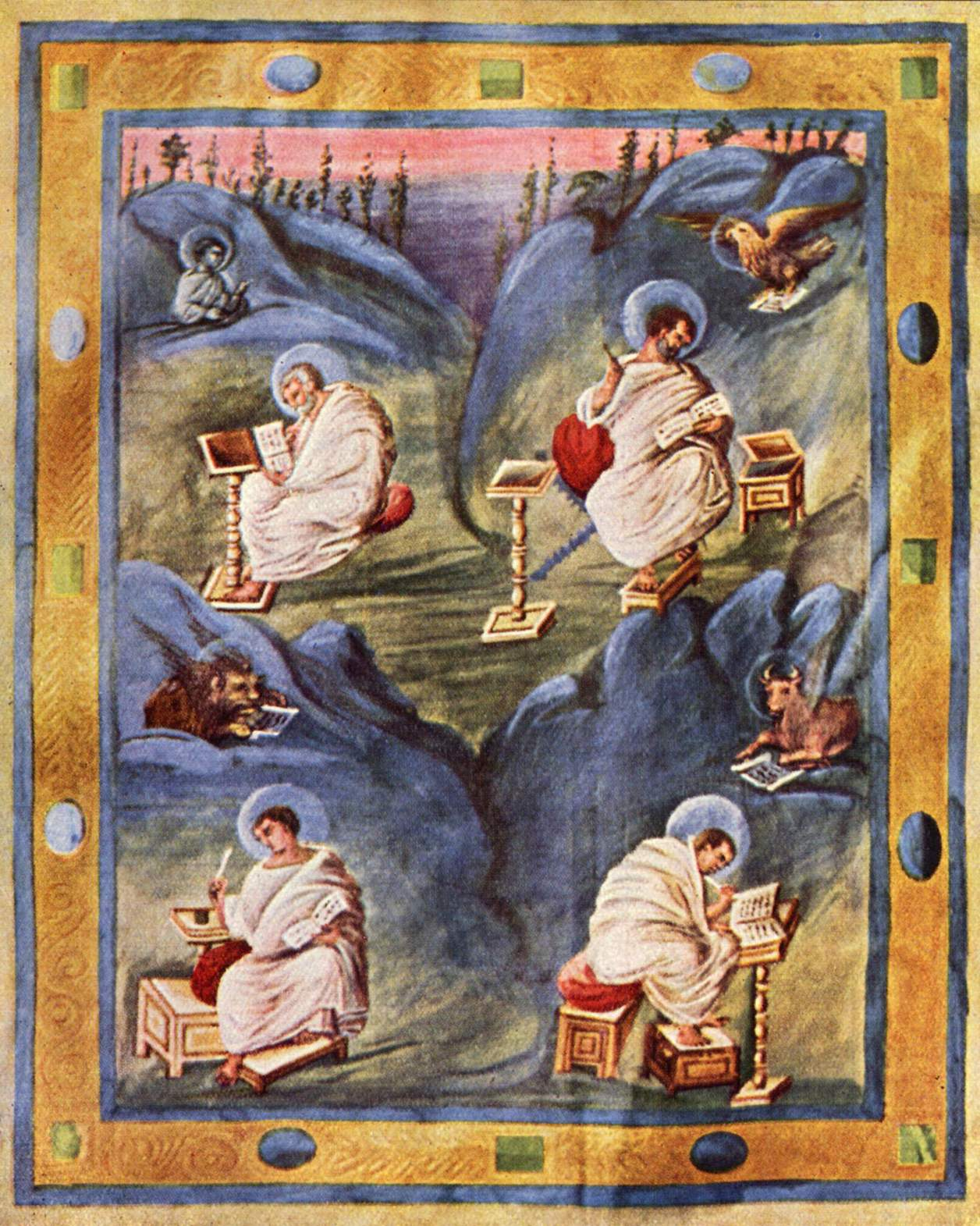
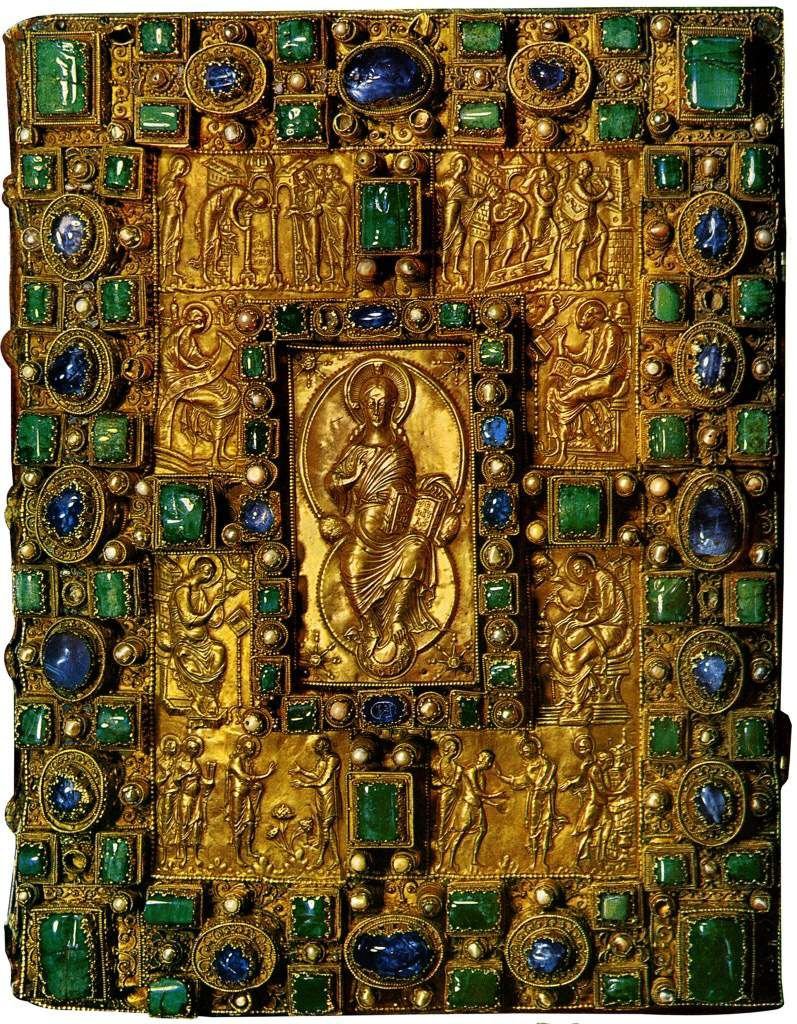
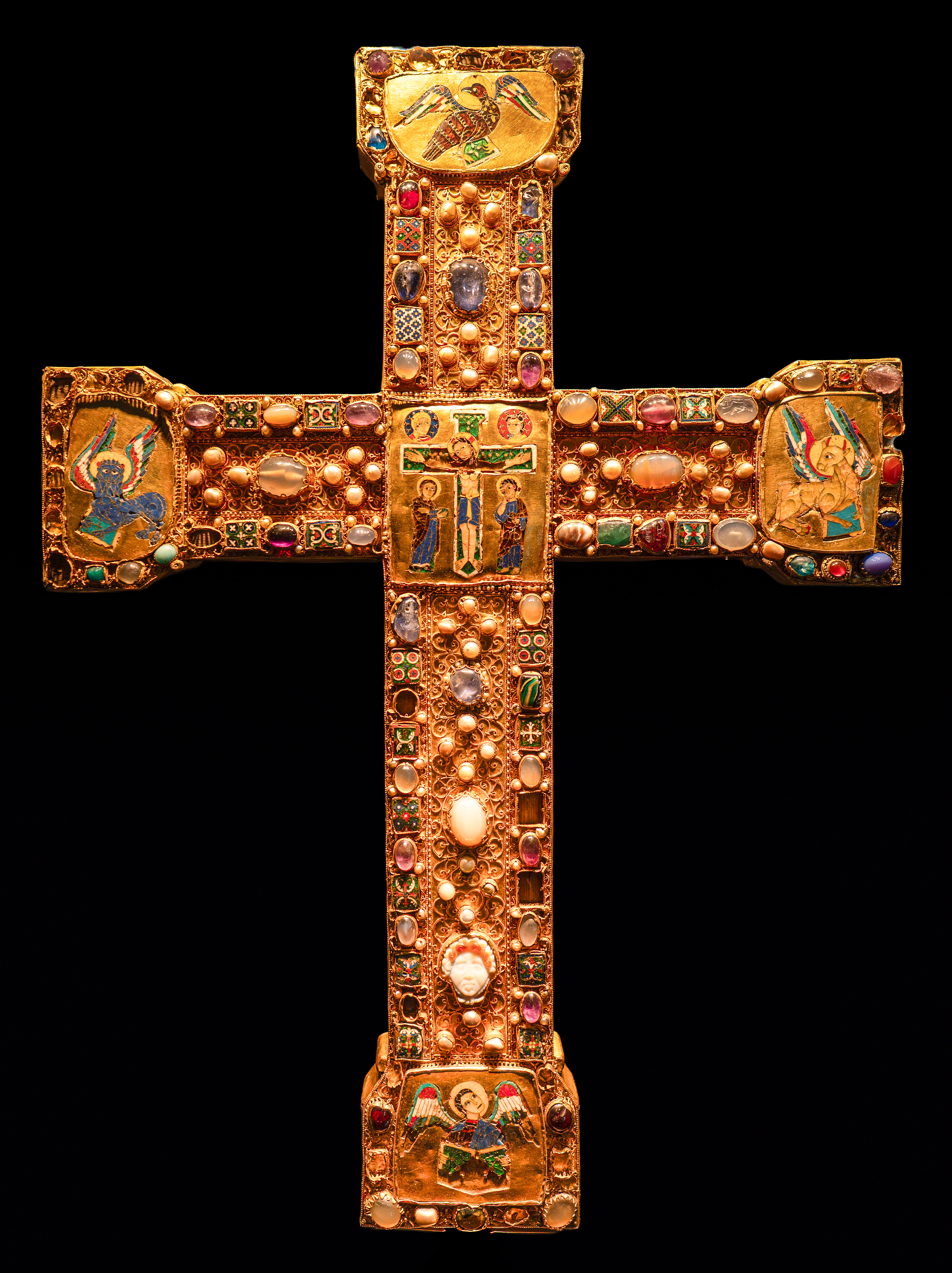
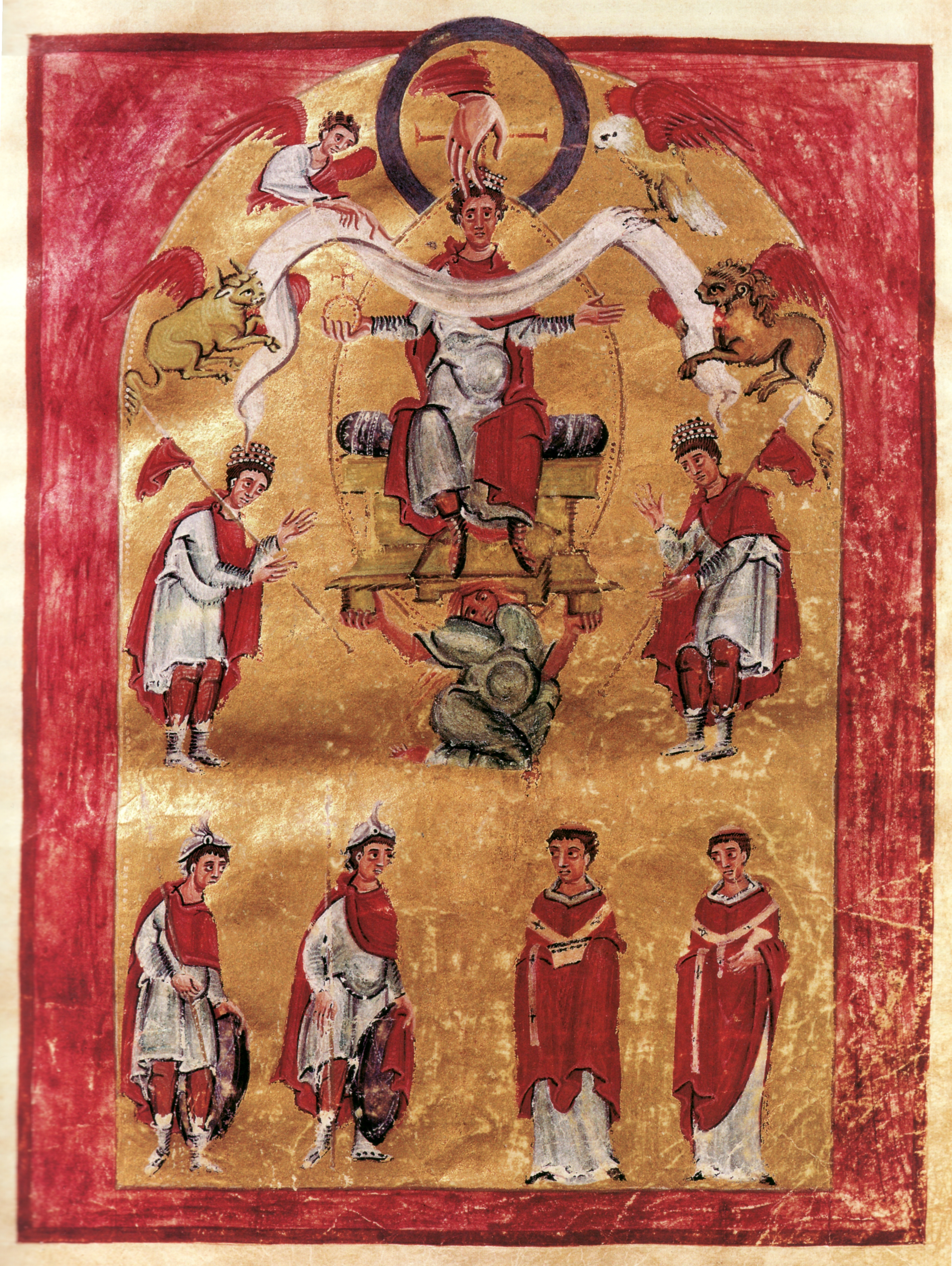
Aachen Gospels, around 820. Codex Aureus of St. Emmeram, 870. The Essen cross with large enamels with gems and large senkschmelz enamels, c. 1000. Apotheosis of Otto III, Liuthar Gospels, around 1000.

Carolingian art (8th–9th centuries) emerged under Charlemagne's rule, blending Roman, early Christian, and Germanic influences to create a distinctive style. It marked the Carolingian Renaissance, focusing on reviving classical Roman artistic traditions while incorporating local Germanic elements. Key features included illuminated manuscripts like the Aachen Gospels, religious iconography, intricate metalwork, and architecture. Notable works include the Charlemagne's palace chapel at Aachen. Carolingian art emphasized Christian themes, with elaborate depictions of saints, biblical scenes, and classical motifs, laying the foundation for later medieval art in Western Europe.

Ottonian art is a style in pre-romanesque German art, covering also some works from the Low Countries, northern Italy and eastern France. It was named by the art historian Hubert Janitschek after the Ottonian dynasty which ruled Germany and northern Italy between 919 and 1024 under the kings Henry I, Otto I, Otto II, Otto III and Henry II. With Ottonian architecture, it is a key component of the Ottonian Renaissance (circa 951–1024). However, the style neither began nor ended to neatly coincide with the rule of the dynasty. It emerged some decades into their rule and persisted past the Ottonian emperors into the reigns of the early Salian dynasty, which lacks an artistic "style label" of its own. In the traditional scheme of art history, Ottonian art follows Carolingian art and precedes Romanesque art, though the transitions at both ends of the period are gradual rather than sudden. Like the former and unlike the latter, it was very largely a style restricted to a few of the small cities of the period, to important monasteries, as well as to the court circles of the emperor and his leading vassals.

After the decline of the 9th-century Carolingian Empire, the Holy Roman Empire was re-established under the Saxon Ottonian dynasty. From this emerged a renewed faith in the idea of Empire and a reformed Church, creating a period of heightened cultural and artistic fervour. In this atmosphere masterpieces were created that fused the traditions from which Ottonian artists derived their inspiration: models of Late Antique, Carolingian, and Byzantine origin. Surviving Ottonian art is very largely religious, in the form of illuminated manuscripts and metalwork, and was produced in a small number of centres for a narrow range of patrons in the circle of the Imperial court, as well as for important figures in the church. However much of it was designed for display to a wider public, especially to pilgrims.

The style is generally grand and heavy, sometimes to excess, and initially less sophisticated than the Carolingian equivalents, with less direct influence from Byzantine art and less understanding of its classical models, but around 1000 a striking intensity and expressiveness emerge in many works, as "a solemn monumentality is combined with a vibrant inwardness, an unworldly, visionary quality with sharp attention to actuality, surface patterns of flowing lines and rich bright colours with passionate emotionalism".

==== Romanesque ====
The Romanesque, the first pan-European style to emerge after the Roman Empire, spanned the mid-tenth century to the thirteenth. The period saw a resurgence of monumental stone structures with complex structural programmes.

Romanesque churches are characterized by rigid articulation and geometric clarity, incorporated into a unified volumetric whole. The architecture is austere but enlivened by decorative sculpting of capitals and portals, as well as frescoed interiors. Geometric and foliate patterning gives way to increasingly three-dimensional figurative sculpture.

St. Michael's Church, Hildesheim, Germany, 1001–1030, is seen by some as a Proto-Romanesque church.

From the mid-eleventh to the early thirteenth centuries, Romanesque paintings were two-dimensional, defined by bold, linear outlines and geometry, particularly in the handling of drapery; painters emphasised symmetry and frontality. Virtually all Western churches were painted, but probably only a few wall-painters were monks; instead, itinerant artists carried out most of this work. Basic blocking-out was done on wet plaster with earth colours. A limited palette, dominated by white, red, yellow ochres and azure, was employed for maximum visual effect, with dense colouring forming a backdrop of bands, a practice that originated in late Classical art as an attempt to distinguish earth and sky.

During the later eleventh and twelfth centuries, the great age of Western monasticism, Europe experienced unprecedented economic, social and political change, leading to burgeoning wealth among landowners, including monasteries. There was increasing demand for books, and economic wealth encouraged the production of richly illuminated manuscripts.

One of the outstanding artefacts of the age is the 70 m long Bayeux Tapestry. It depicts the events leading up to the Norman conquest of England with protagonists William, Duke of Normandy, and Harold, Earl of Wessex, later King of England, and culminating in the Battle of Hastings of 1066. It is thought to date from the 11th century. It tells the story from the point of view of the conquering Normans, but is now agreed to have been made in England - most likely by women, although the designer is unknown. It is housed in France.

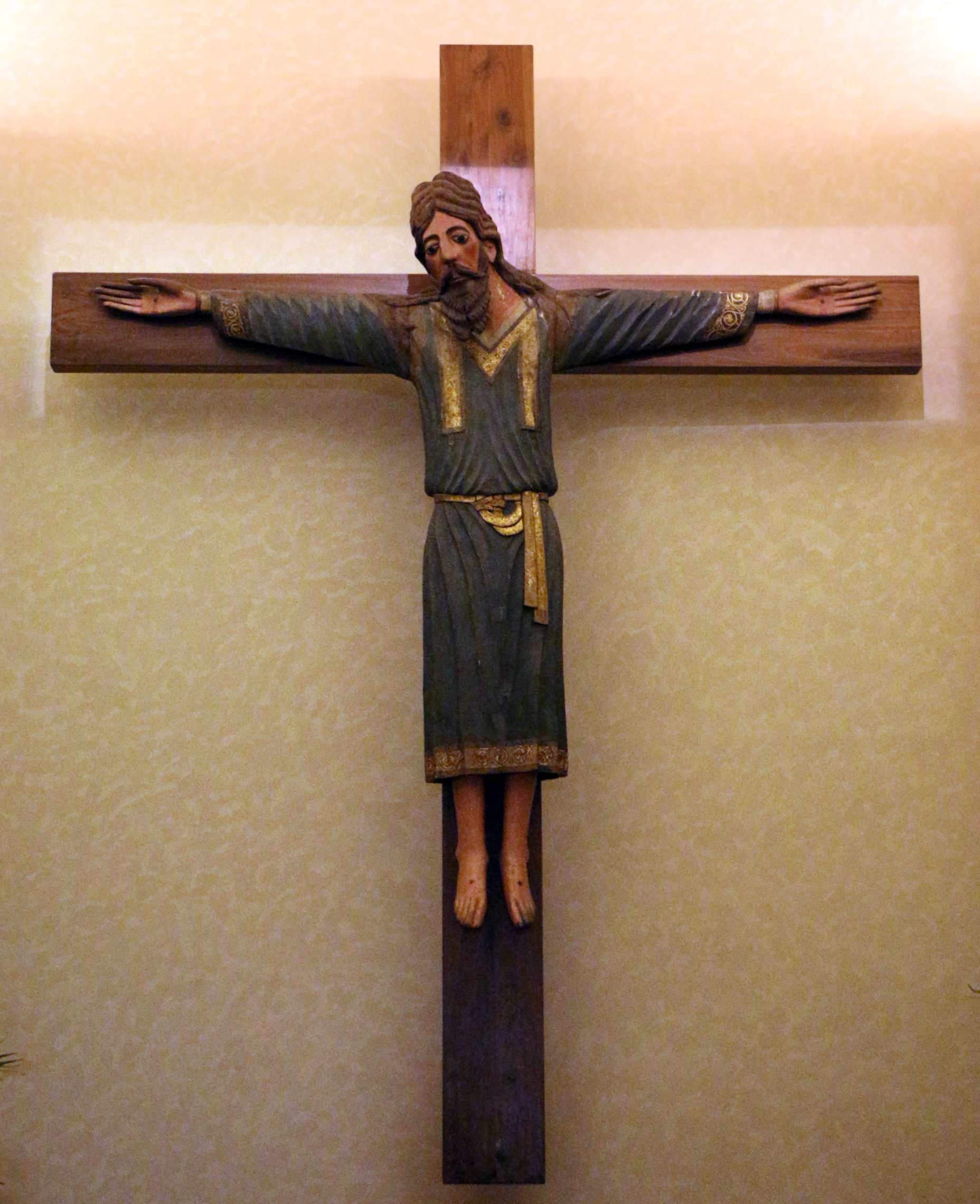
'Holy Face'; 904–1018; wood with polychromy; height: 2.9 m; Sansepolcro Cathedral (Sansepolcro, Italy)

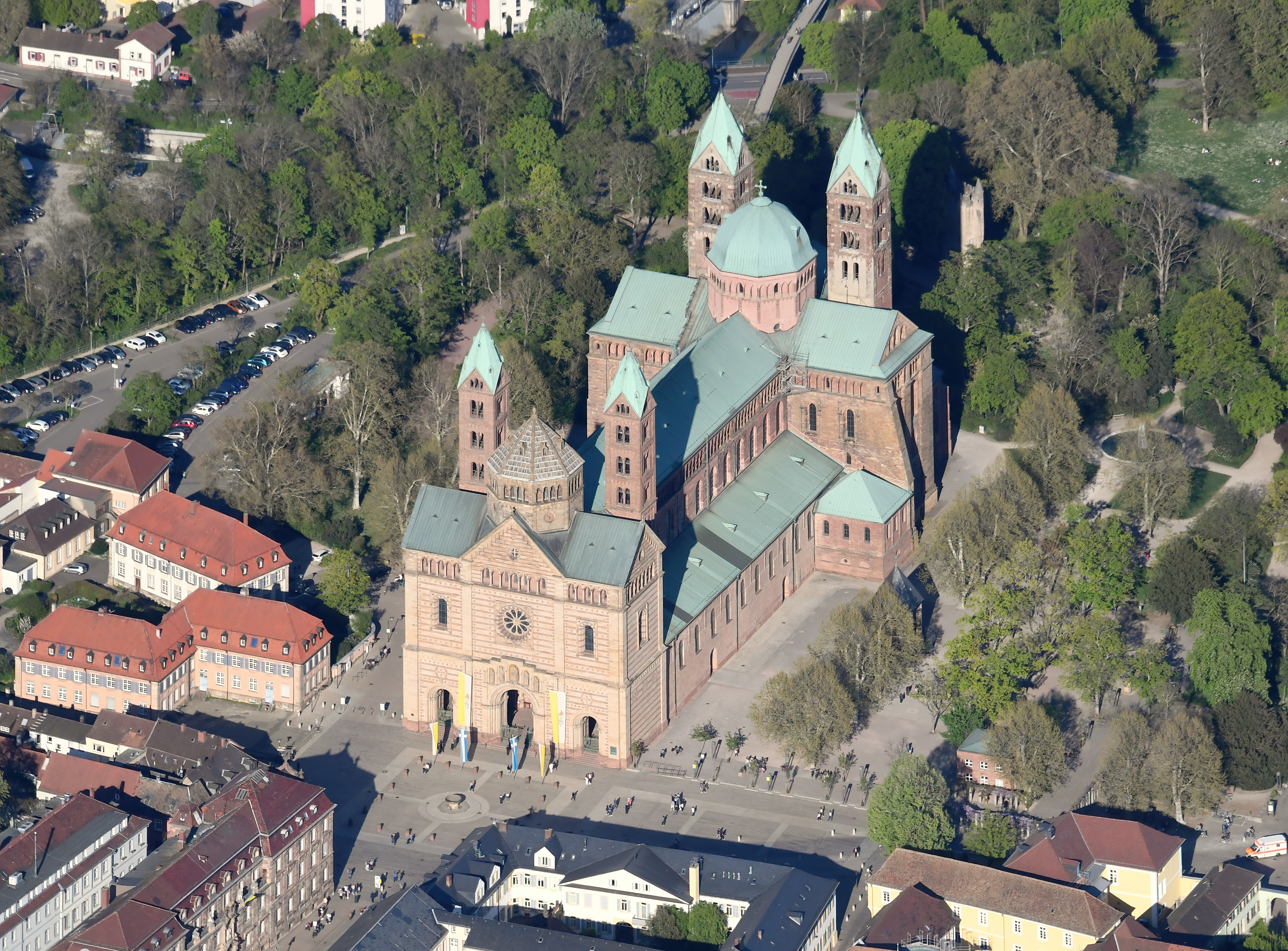
Speyer cathedral (Speyer, Germany), 1030-1106

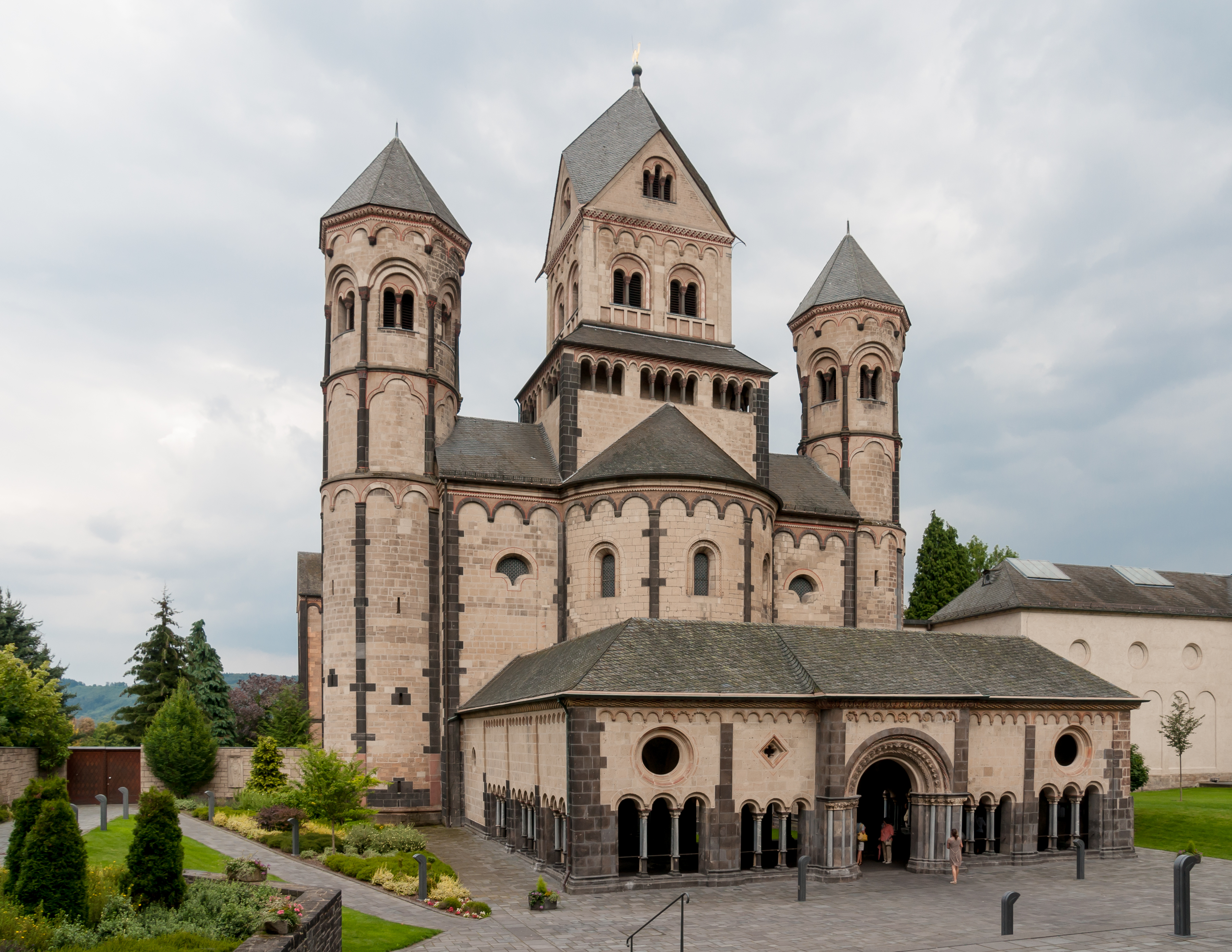
Maria Laach Abbey (Rhineland-Palatinate, Germany), 1093-1230

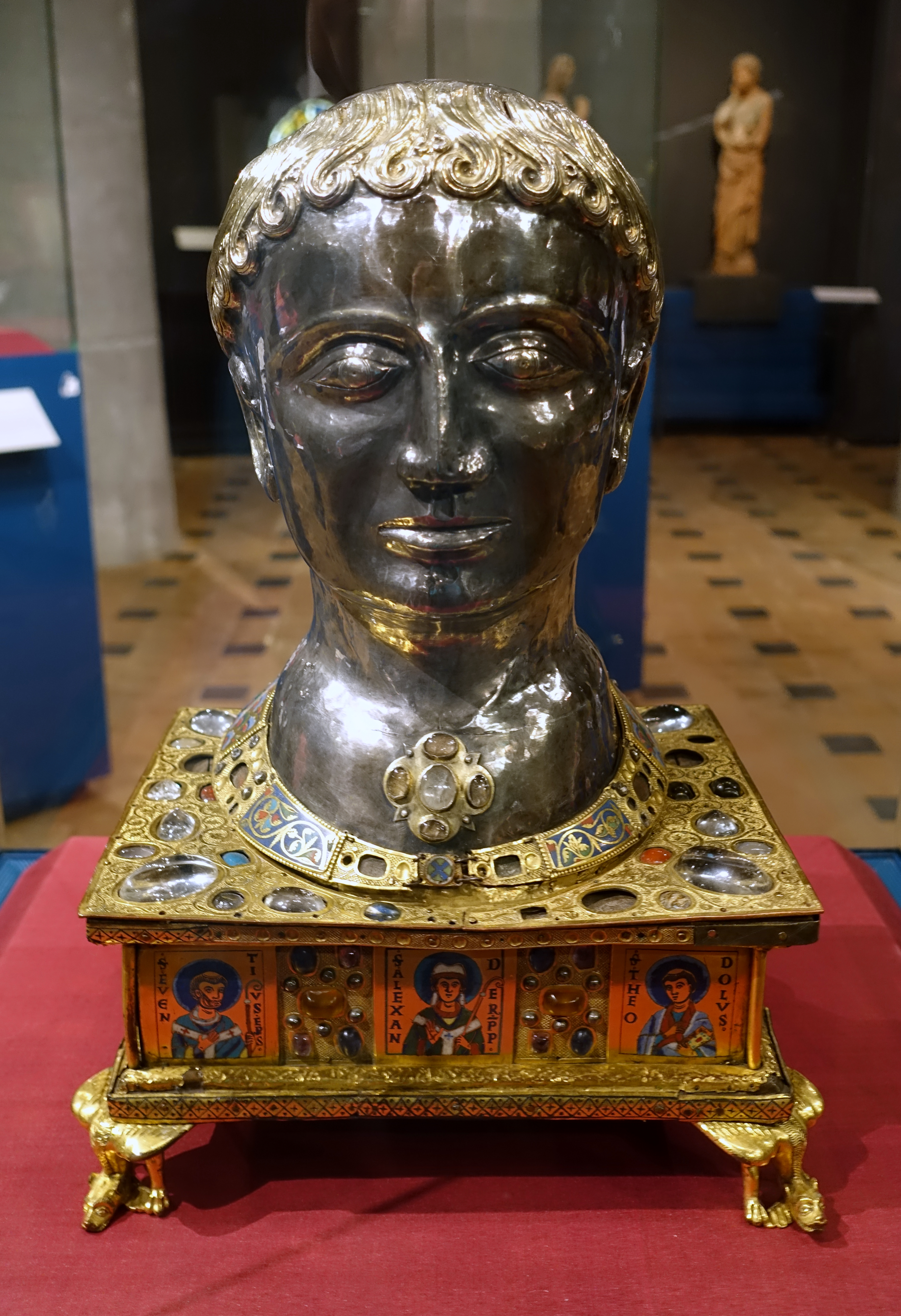
Head of pope Alexander; 1145; wood, silver, gilt bronze, gems, pearls and champlevé enamel; height: c. 45 cm; Art & History Museum (Brussels, Belgium)

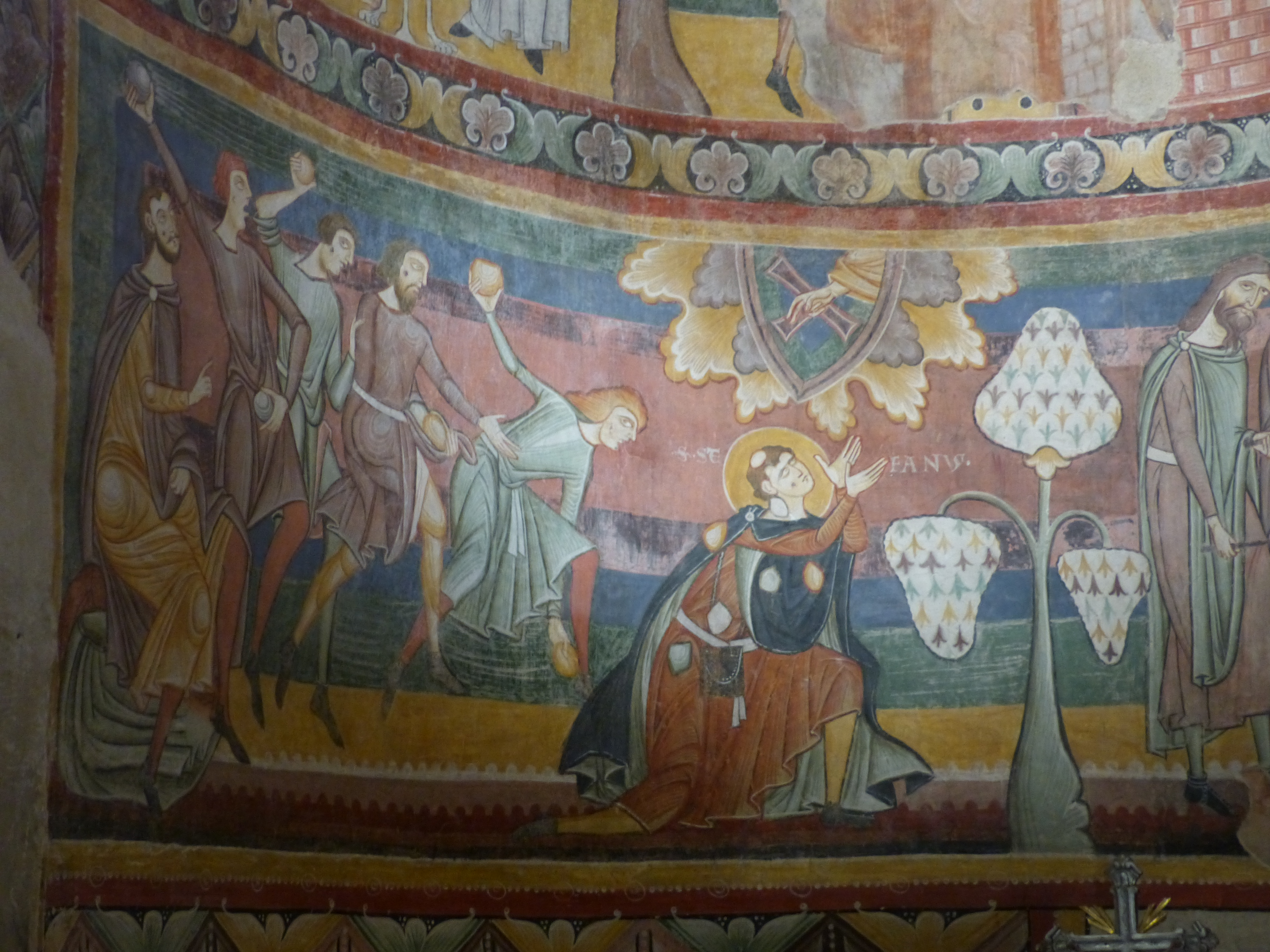
The stoning of Saint Stephen; 1160s; fresco; height: 1.3 m; Saint John Abbey (Val Müstair, Canton of Grisons, Switzerland)

=== Gothic ===
Gothic art developed in Northern France out of Romanesque in the 12th century AD, and led by the concurrent development of Gothic architecture. It spread to all of Western Europe, and much of Southern and Central Europe, never quite effacing more classical styles in Italy. In the late 14th century, the sophisticated court style of International Gothic developed, which continued to evolve until the late 15th century.

Brick Gothic was a specific style of Gothic architecture common in Northeast and Central Europe especially in the regions in and around the Baltic Sea, which do not have resources of standing rock. The buildings are essentially built using bricks.

The imposing Gothic cathedrals, with their sculptural programmes and stained glass windows, epitomize the Gothic style. It differs from Romanesque through its rib-shaped vaults, and the use of ogives. Instead of the thick Romanesque walls, Gothic buildings are thin and tall. Spiral stairs in towers are specific to Gothic architecture.

Gothic painting, much of it executed in tempera and, later, oils on panel, as well as fresco, and with an increasingly broad palette of secondary colours, is generally seen as more 'naturalistic' than Romanesque. The humanity of religious narrative was highlighted, and the emotional state of the characters individualized. The increased urbanity of the medieval economy and the rise of the clerical and lay patron saw a change in the nature of the art market, which can be seen in developments in Gothic manuscript illumination. Workshops employed specialists for different elements of the page, such as figures or marginal vine motifs.

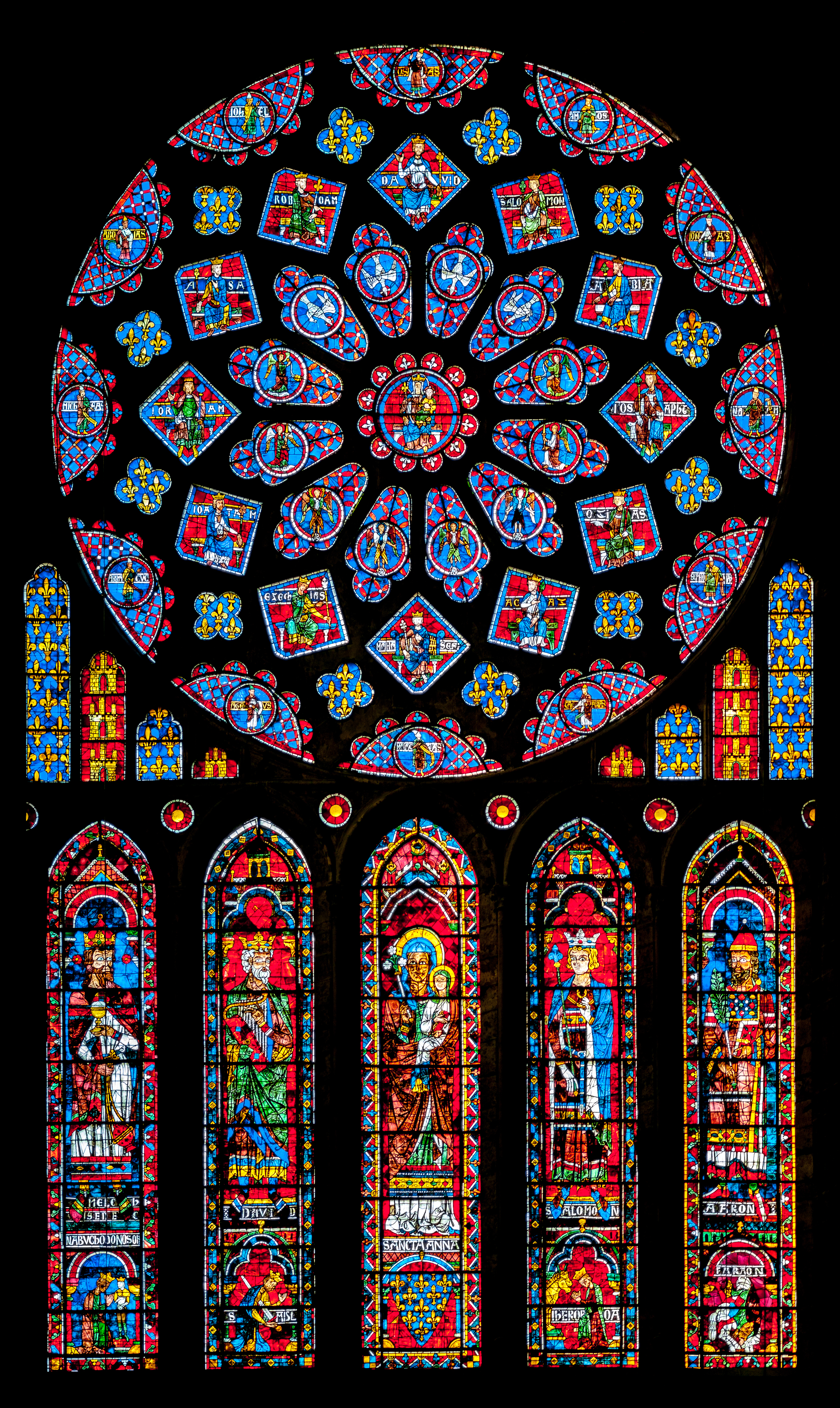
North transept windows; c. 1230–1235; stained glass; diameter (rose window): 10.2 m; Chartres Cathedral (Chartres, France)

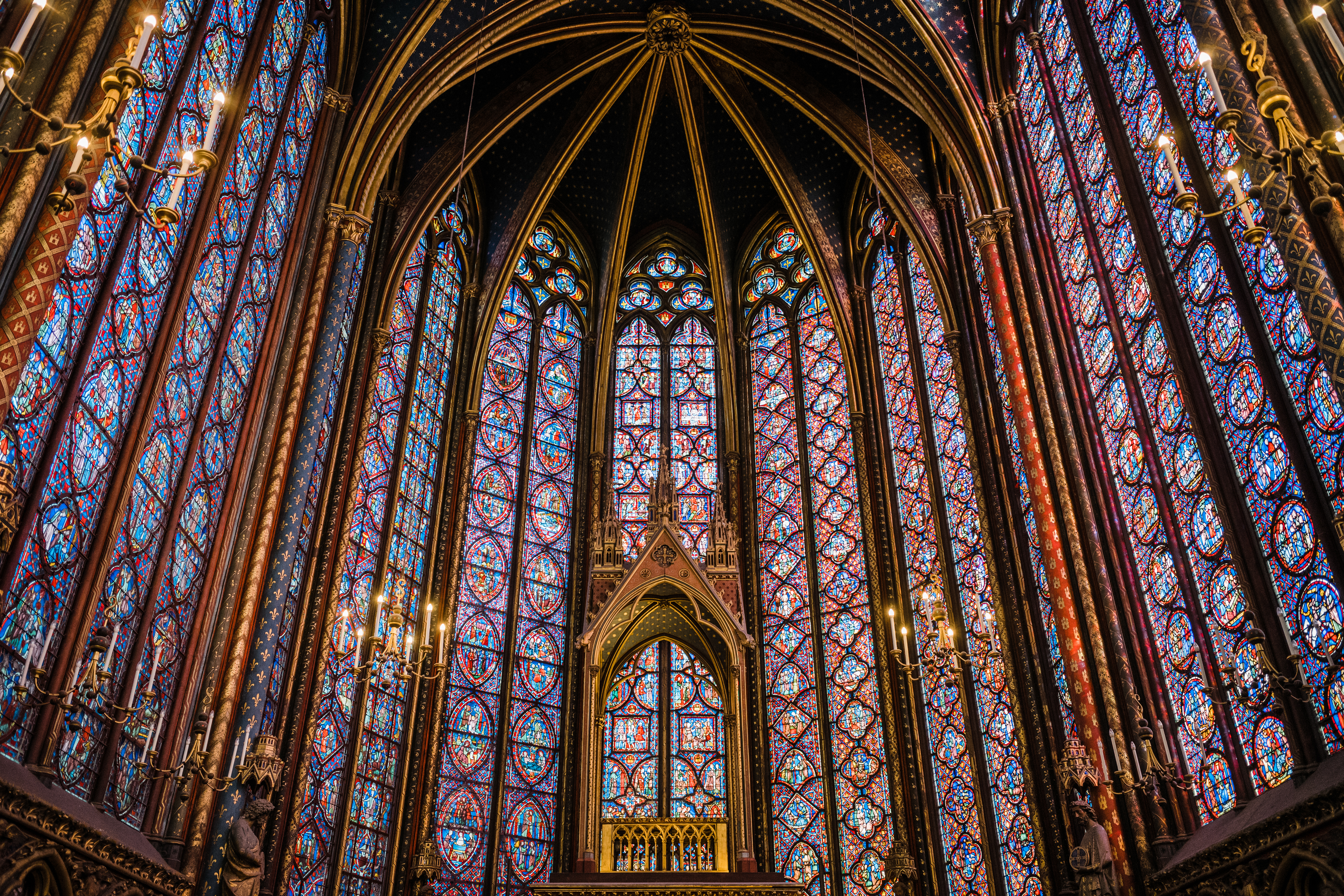
The Sainte-Chapelle (Paris), 1243–1248, by Pierre de Montreuil

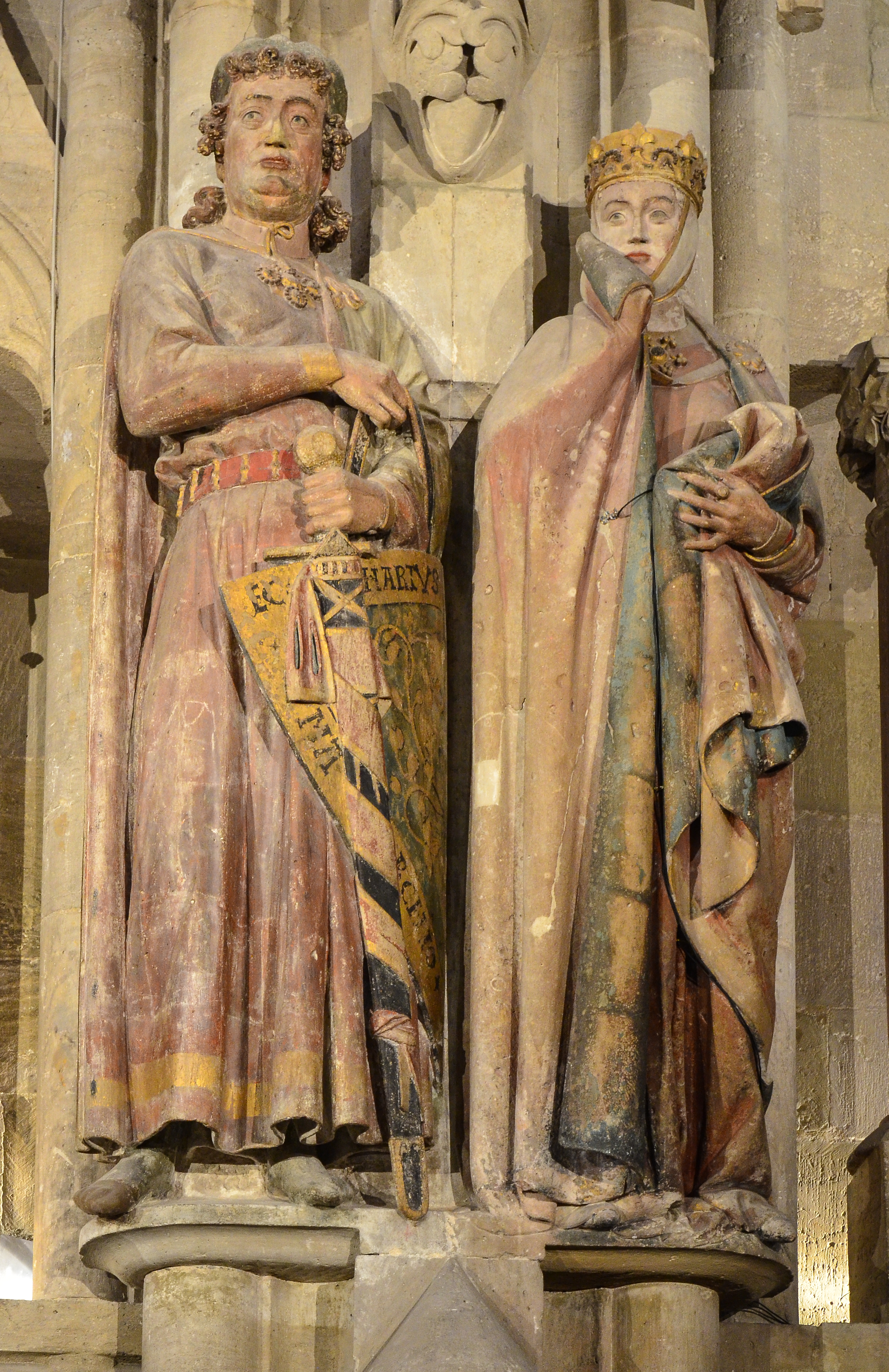
Ekkehard and Uta; attributed to the Master of Naumburg; 1245–1260; limestone and polychromy; height: c. 1.9 m; Naumburg Cathedral (Naumburg, Germany)

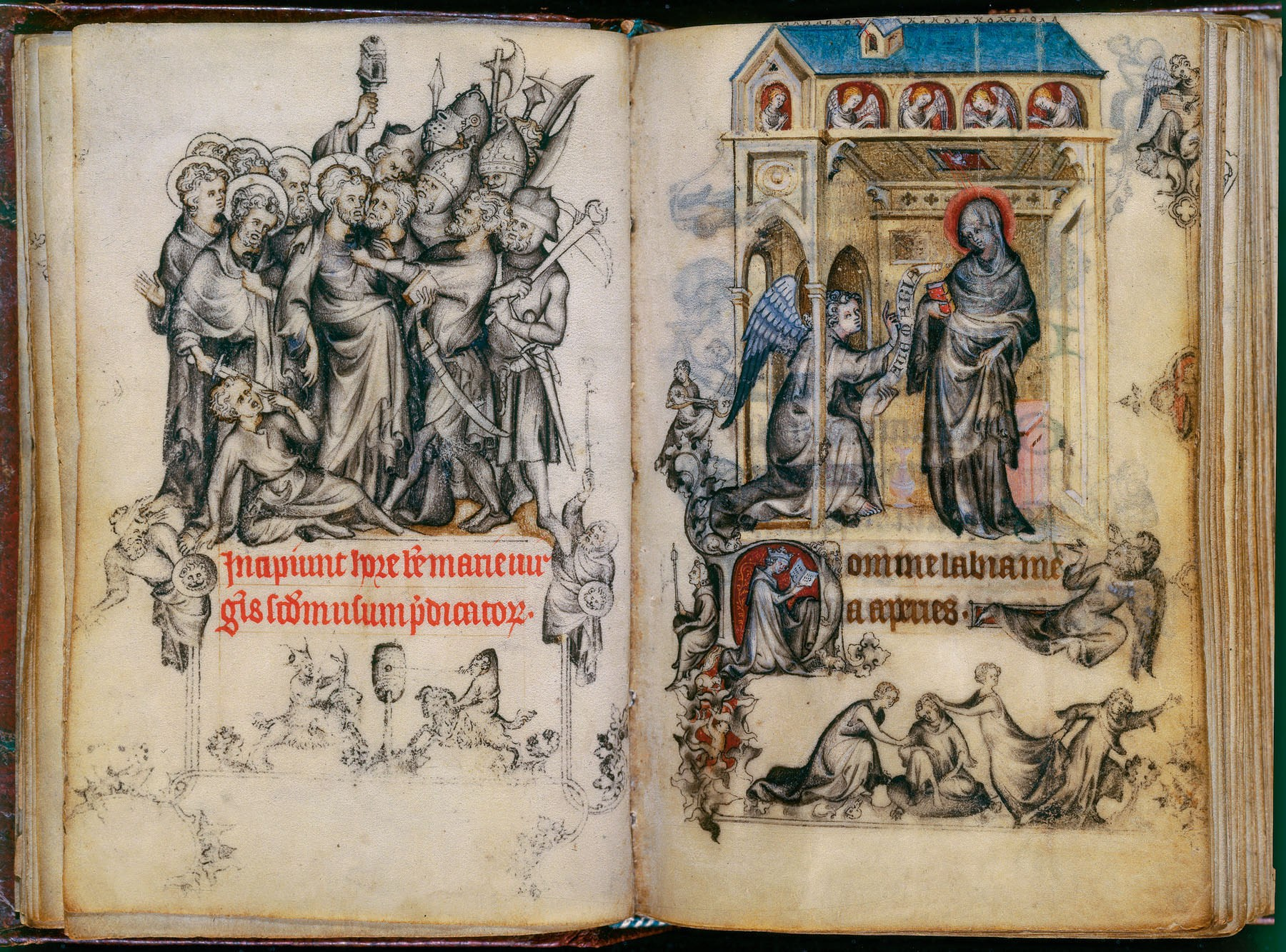
Arrest of Christ and Annunciation of the Virgin; by Jean Pucelle; 1324–1328; grisaille and temprea on vellum; 8.9 x 12.4 cm; Metropolitan Museum of Art (New York City)

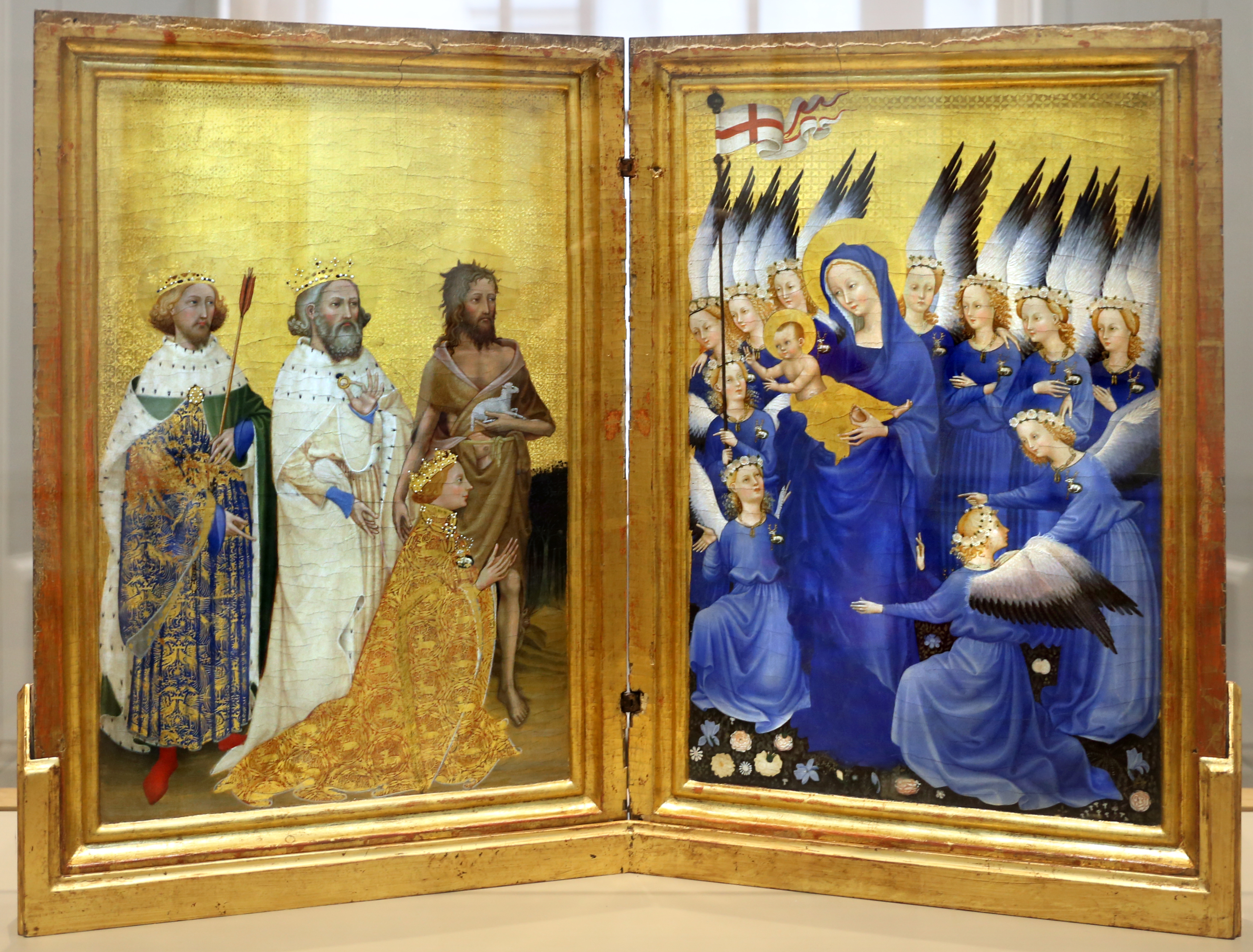
The Wilton Diptych; c. 1395–1459; tempera and gold on panel; 53 × 37 cm; National Gallery (London)

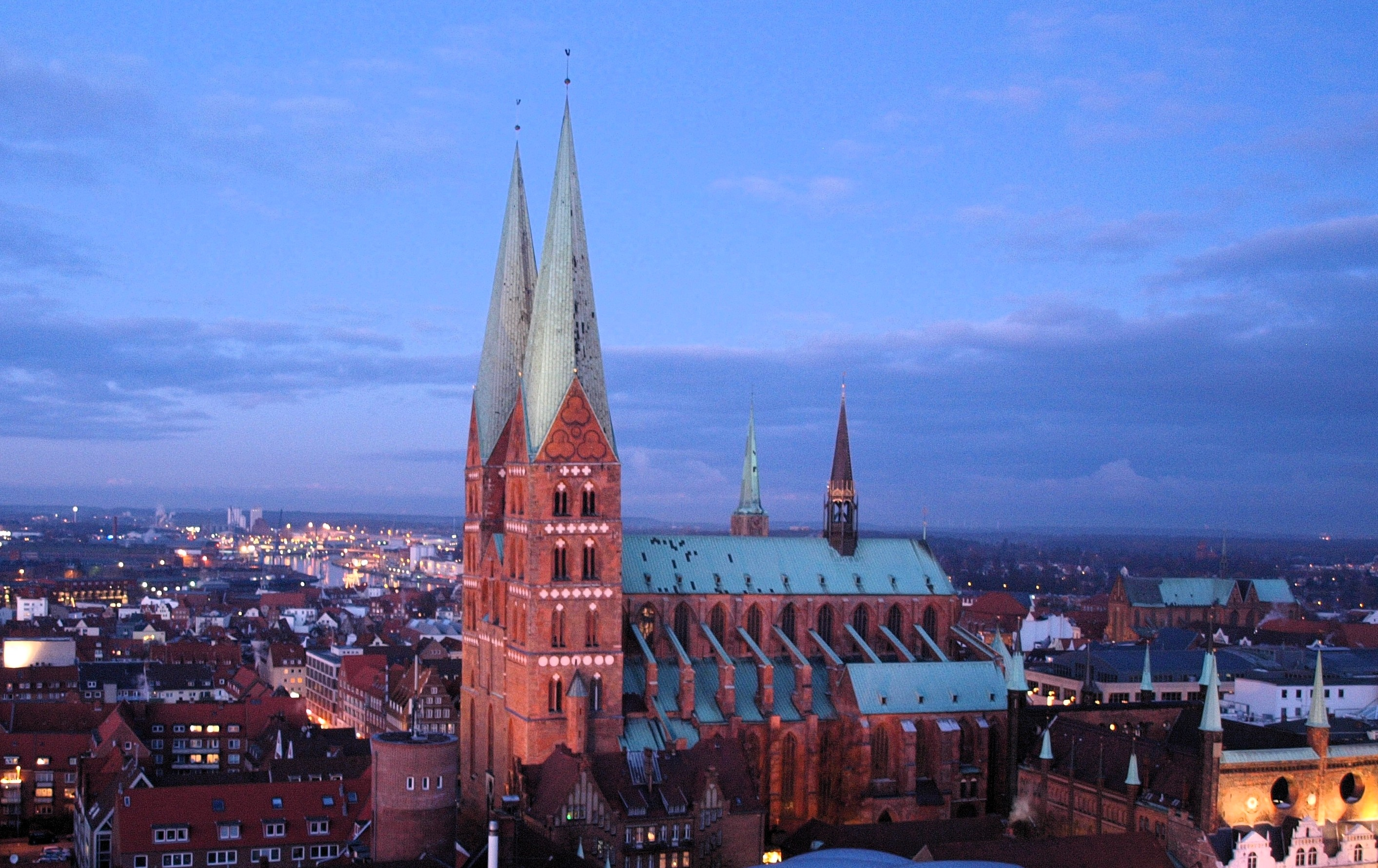
St. Mary's Church, 1265-1352, in Lübeck, Germany

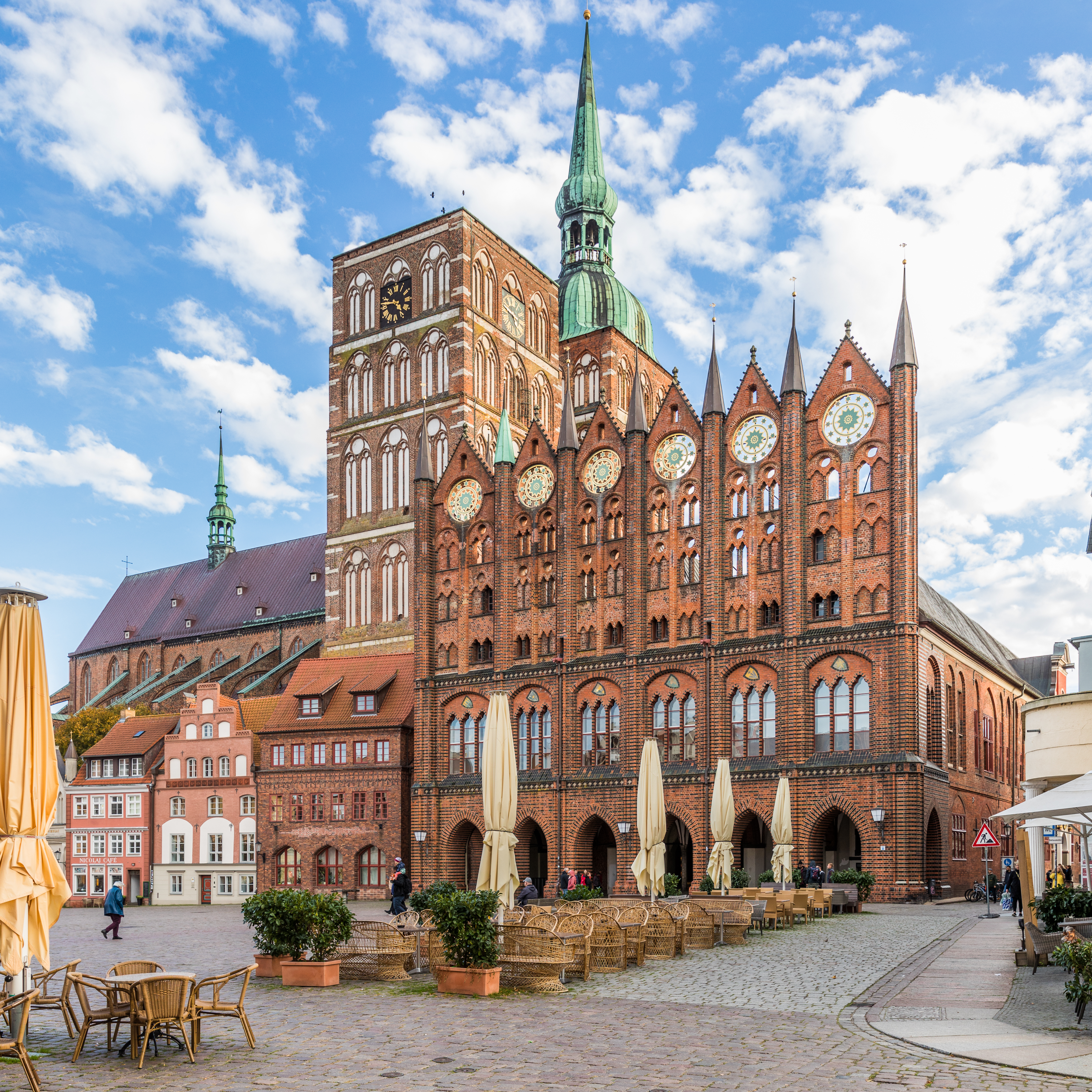
Town Hall and St. Nicholas' church in Stralsund, from around 1250 to 1400, Germany

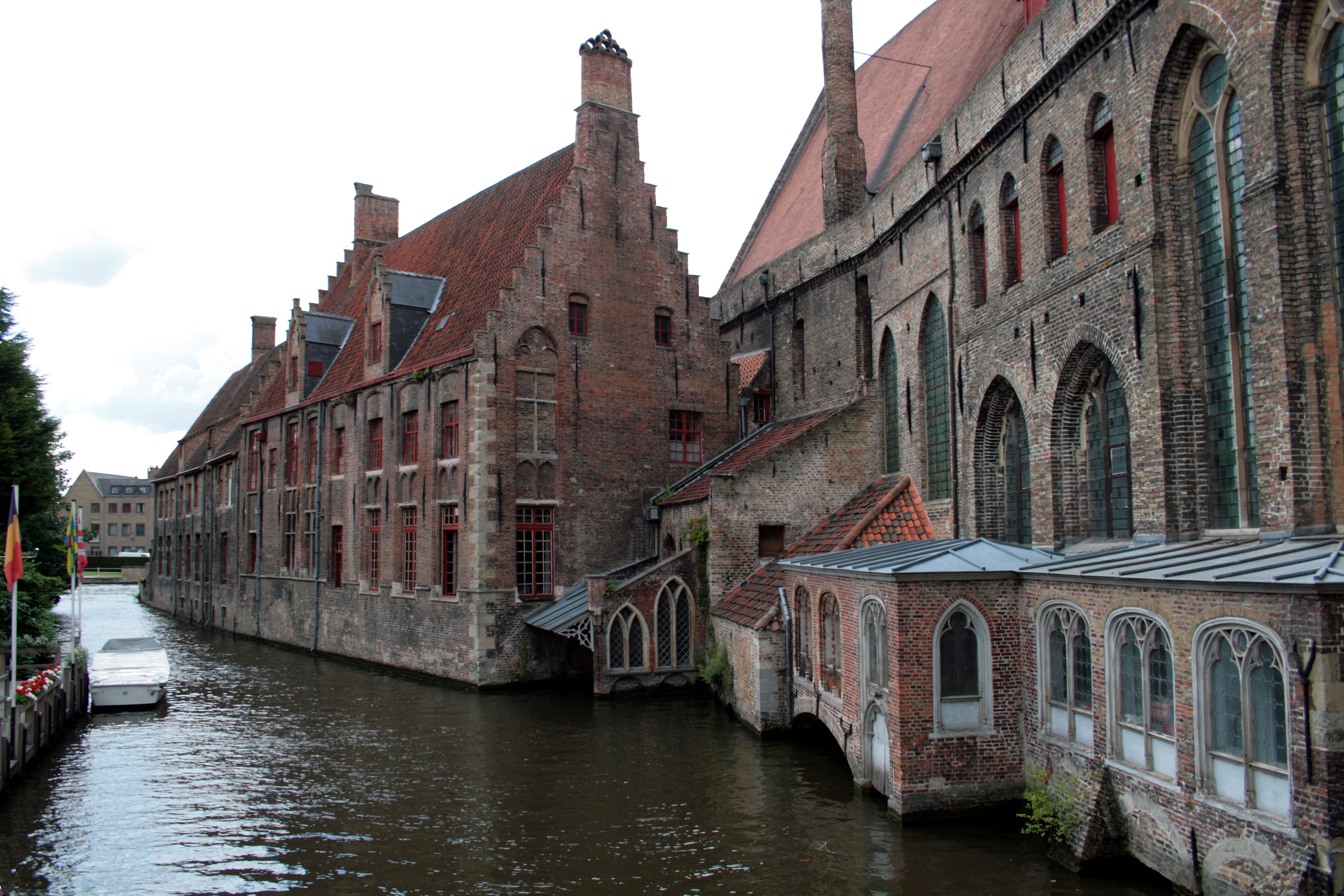
Brick Gothic with some decoration of stone, Old St. John's Hospital, 13th to 15th century, in Bruges, Belgium

=== Renaissance ===
Encompassing Early, Northern and High Renaissance, the term Renaissance describes the 'rebirth' in Europe of a new interest for Classical antiquity. For the first time since antiquity, art became convincingly lifelike. Besides the ancient past, Renaissance artists also studied nature, understanding the human body, animals, plants, space, perspective and the qualities of light. The most common theme were religious subjects, but depictions of mythological stories were produced as well. Also, there was no uniform Renaissance style. Each artist developed their own distinct visual language, influenced by their predecessors and contemporaries.

The Early Renaissance was a period of great creative and intellectual activity when artists broke away completely from the parameters of Byzantine art. It is generally accepted that it started in Florence in present-day Italy in the early 15th century. It is characterized by a surge of interest in classical literature, philosophy and art, the growth of commerce, the discovery of new continents, and new inventions. There was a revival of interest in the art and literature of ancient Rome, and the study of ancient Greek and Latin texts instigated concepts of individualism and reason, which became known as humanism. Humanists considered life in the present and emphasized the importance of individual thought, which affected artists' approaches.

Despite being highly associated with Italy, particularly with Florence, Rome, and Venice, the rest of Western Europe participated to the Renaissance as well. The Northern Renaissance occurred in Europe north of the Alps from the early 15th century, following a period of artistic cross-fertilization between north and south known as 'International Gothic'. There was a big difference between the Northern and Italian Renaissance. The North artists did not seek to revive the values of ancient Greece and Rome like the Italians, while in the south Italian artists and patrons were amazed by the empirical study of nature and the human society, and by the deep colors that northern artists could achieve in the newly developed medium of oil paint. The Protestant Reformation increased the northern interest in secular painting, like portraits or landscapes. Two key northern artists are Hieronymus Bosch, known for his surreal paintings filled with hybrid creatures like The Garden of Earthly Delights, and Albrecht Dürer, who brought the new art of printmaking to a new level.

The High Renaissance took place in the late 15th-early 16th centuries and was influenced by the fact that as papal power stabilized in Rome, several popes commissioned art and architecture, determined to recreate the city's former glory. Raphael and Michelangelo produced vast and grandiose projects for the popes. The most famous artwork of this part of the Renaissance is probably the ceiling of the Sistine Chapel.

Mannerism broke away from High Renaissance ideals of harmony and a rational approach to art, to embrace exaggerated forms, elongated proportions, and more vibrant colors. It developed in Italy between 1510 and 1520, among artists who prized originality above all. The name of this movement comes from the Italian maniera, meaning 'style' or 'manner'. The word was meant to describe the standard of excellence achieved during the High Renaissance, to which all art should now adhere, but in practice it led to stylization and art 'to show art', sometimes with great success, an example being Raphael's pupil Giulio Romano. Mannerism has also been used more generally to describe a period following the Renaissance and preceding the Baroque.

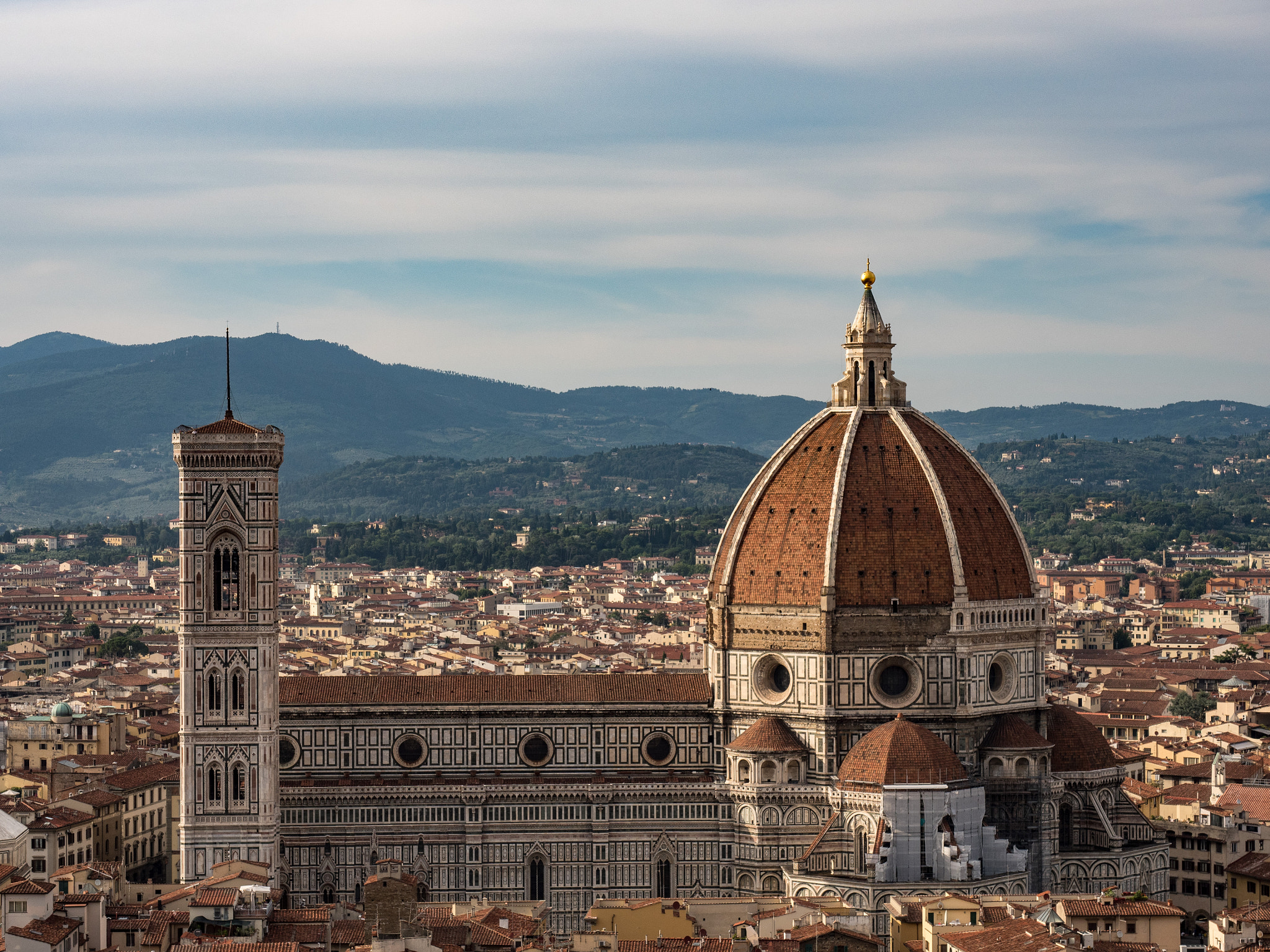
The Florence Cathedral (Florence, Italy), 1294–1436, by Arnolfo di Cambio, Filippo Brunelleschi and Emilio De Fabris

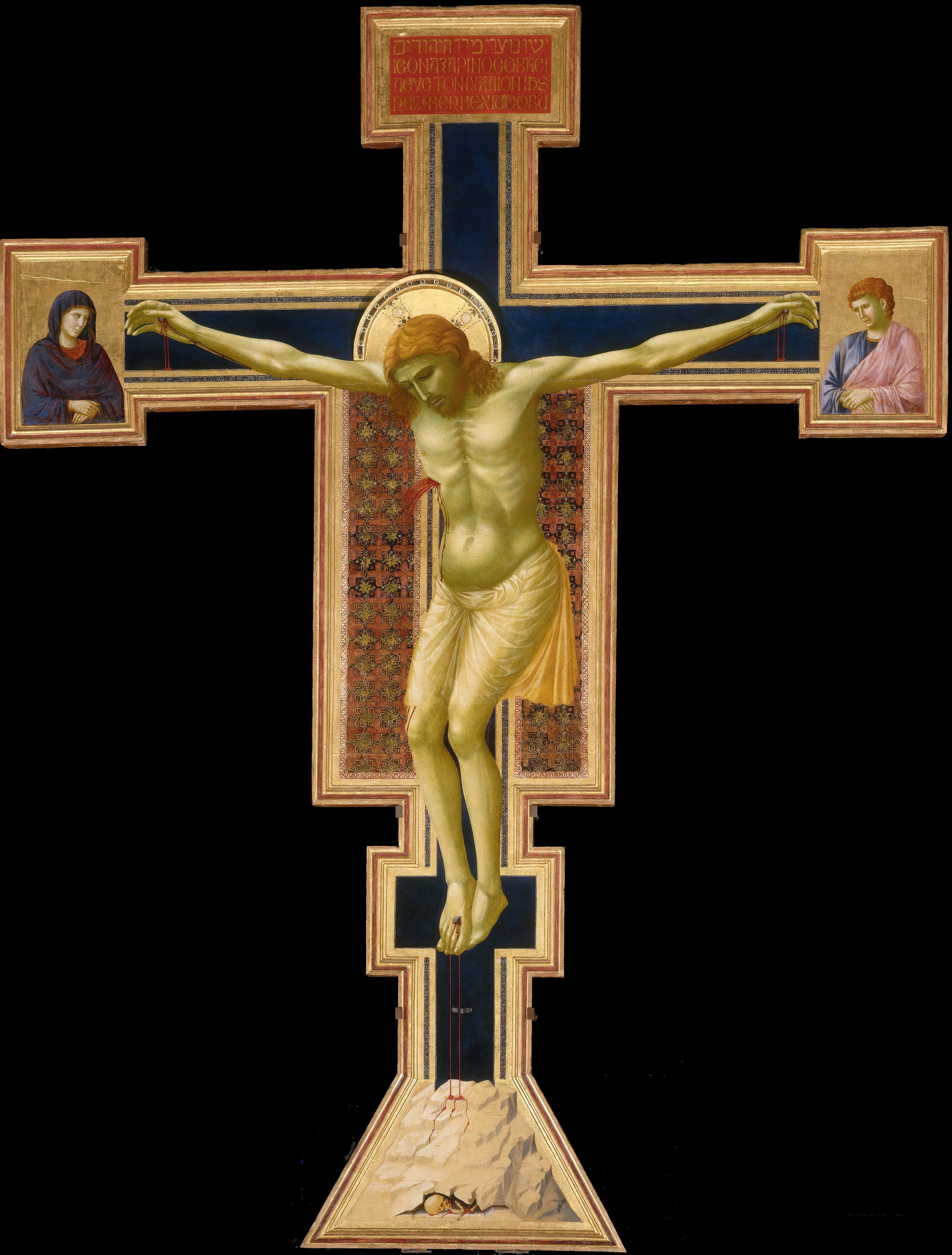
Crucifix; by Giotto; c. 1300; tempera on panel; 5.78 x 4.06 m; Santa Maria Novella (Florence, Italy)

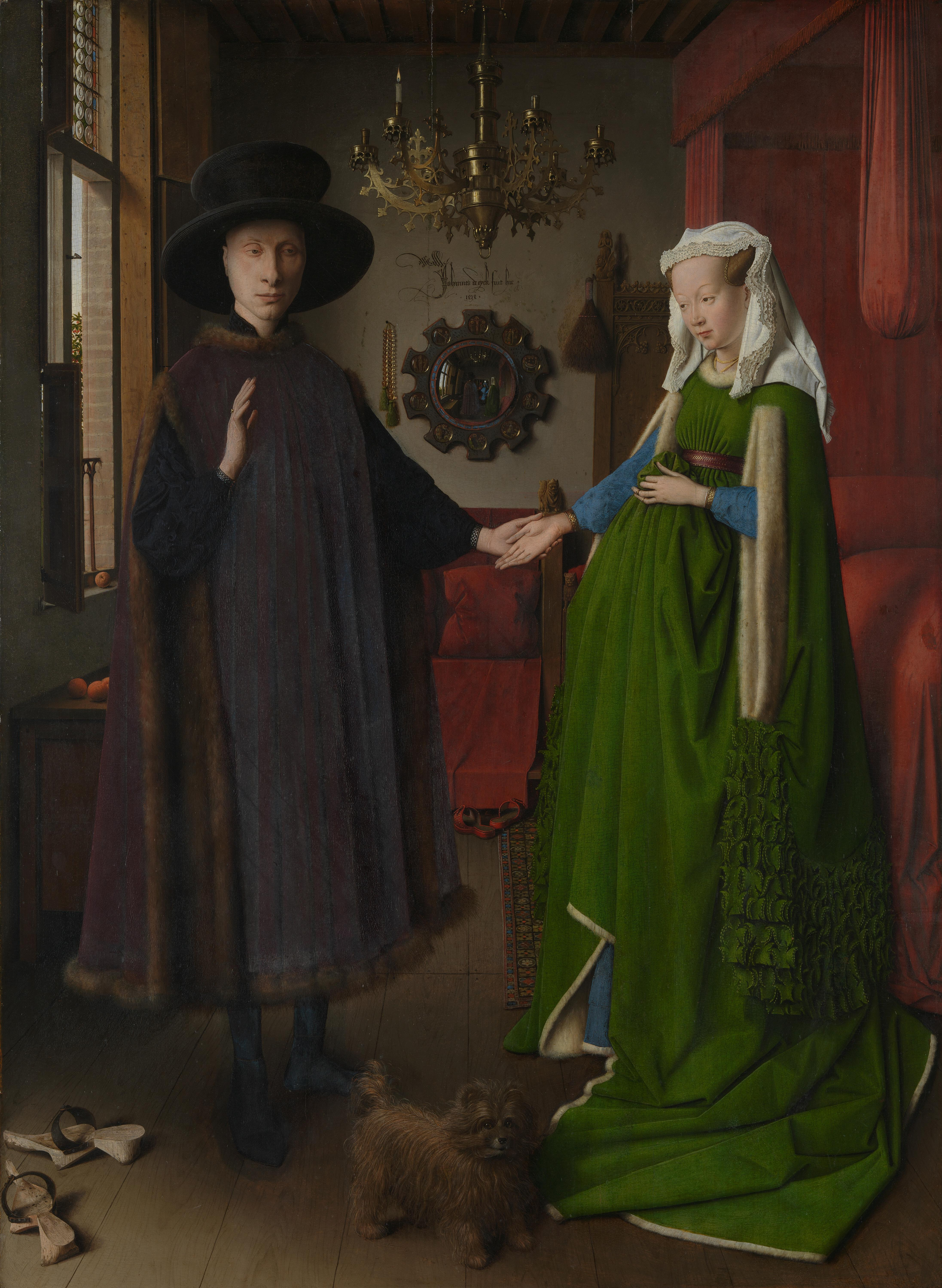
Arnolfini Portrait; by Jan van Eyck; 1434; oil on panel; 82.2 x 60 cm; National Gallery (London)

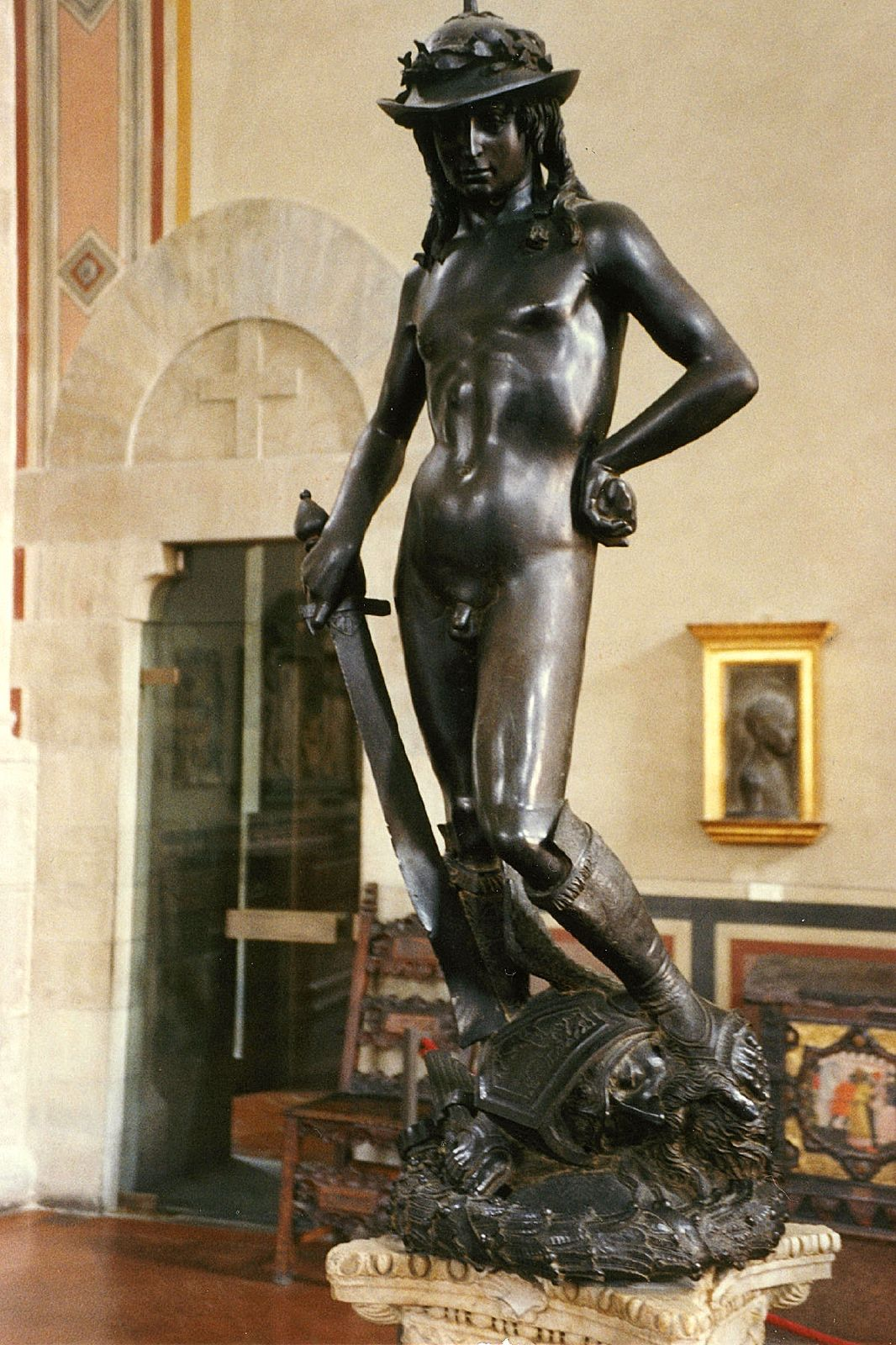
David; by Donatello; c. 1460s; bronze; height: 1.6 m; Bargello (Florence)

Saint George and the Dragon; by Paolo Uccello; c. 1470; oil on canvas; 55.6 x 74.2 cm; National Gallery (London)

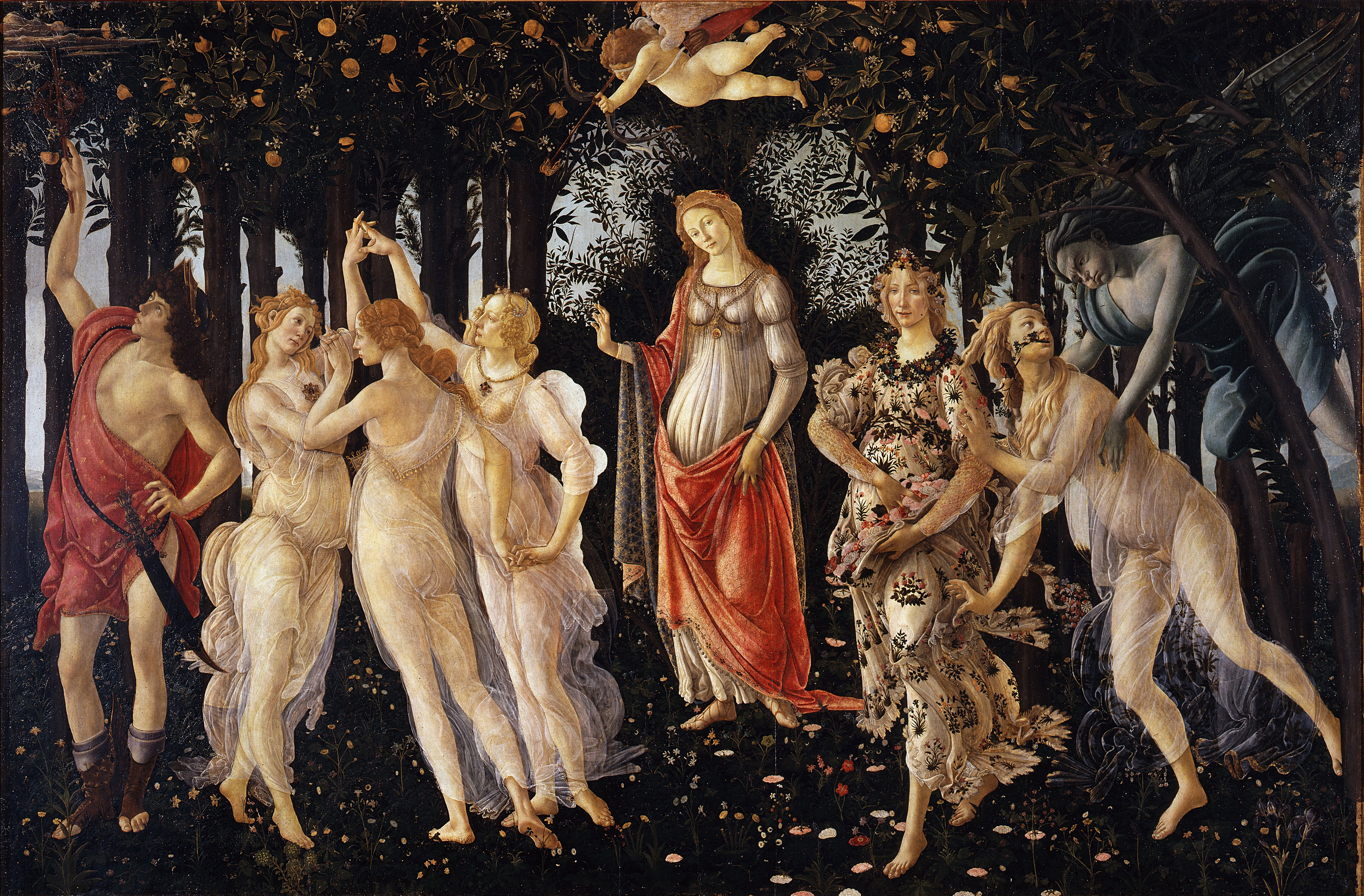
Primavera; by Sandro Botticelli; c. 1478; tempera on panel; 2 x 3.1 m; Uffizi Gallery (Florence)

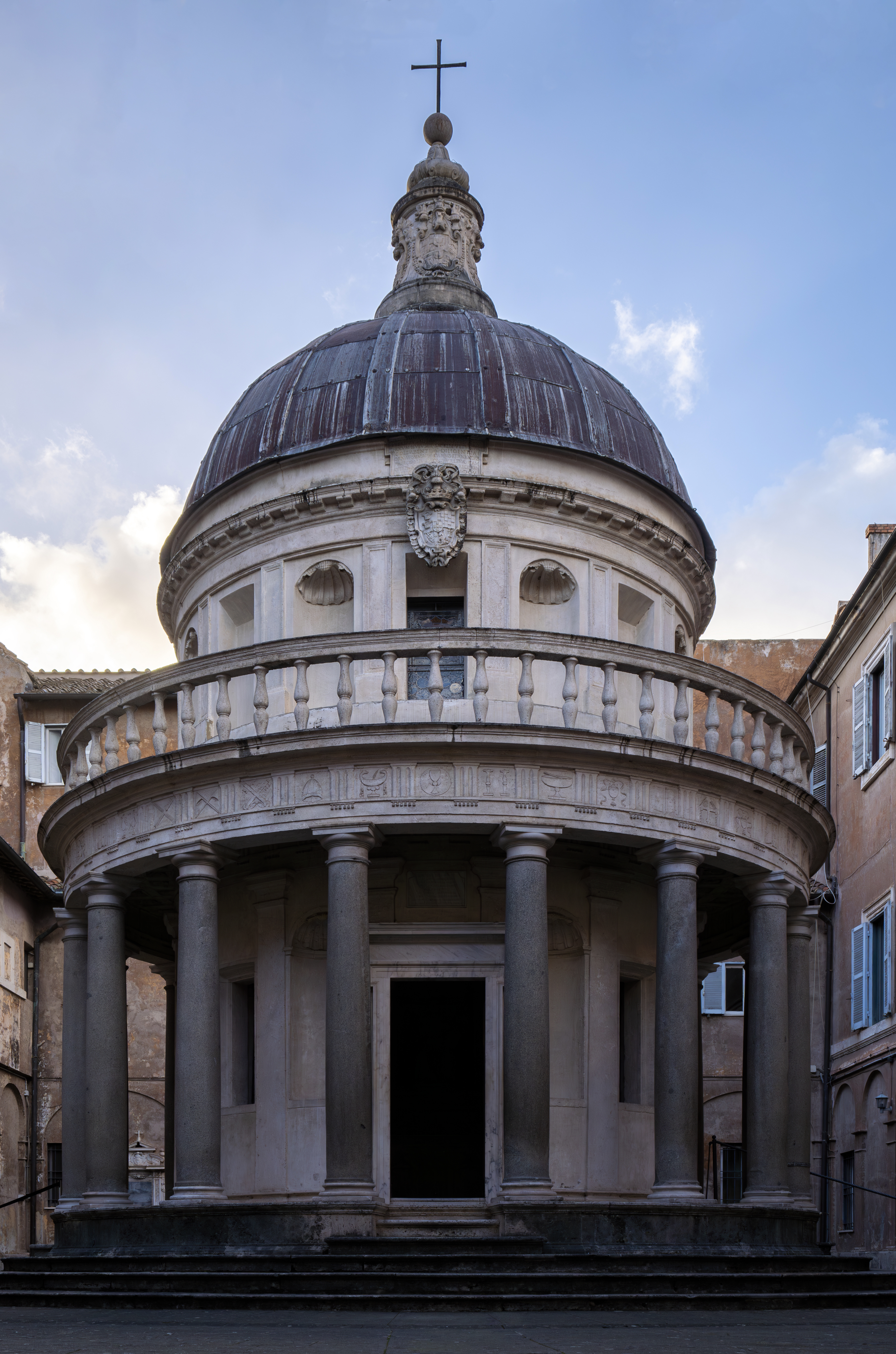
The Tempietto (San Pietro in Montorio, Rome), 1502, by Donato Bramante

Mona Lisa; by Leonardo da Vinci; c.1503-1519; oil on poplar panel; 77 × 53 cm; Louvre

The Garden of Earthly Delights; by Hieronymus Bosch; c. 1504; oil on panel; 2.2 x 1.95 m; Museo del Prado (Madrid, Spain)

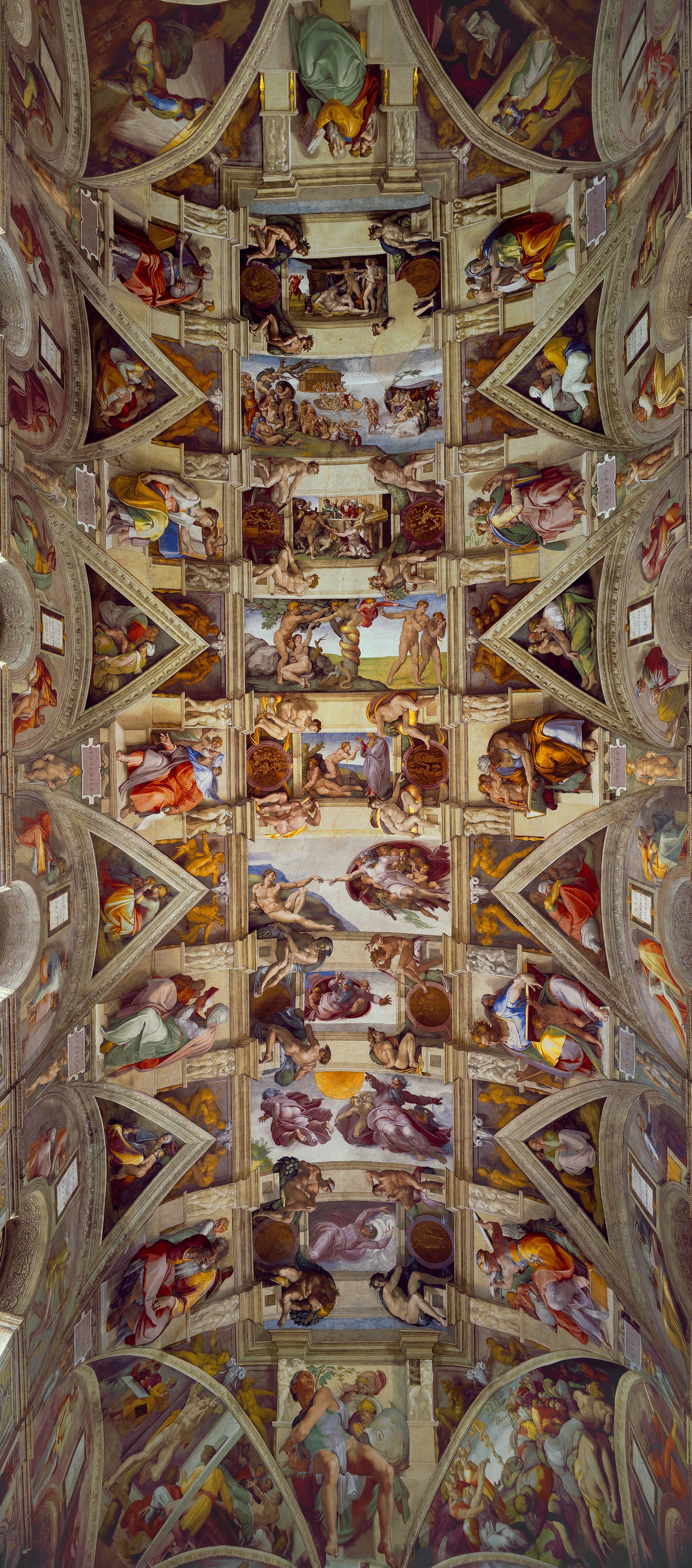
Sistine Chapel ceiling; by Michelangelo; 1508–1512; fresco; 13.7 x 39 m; Sistine Chapel (Vatican City)

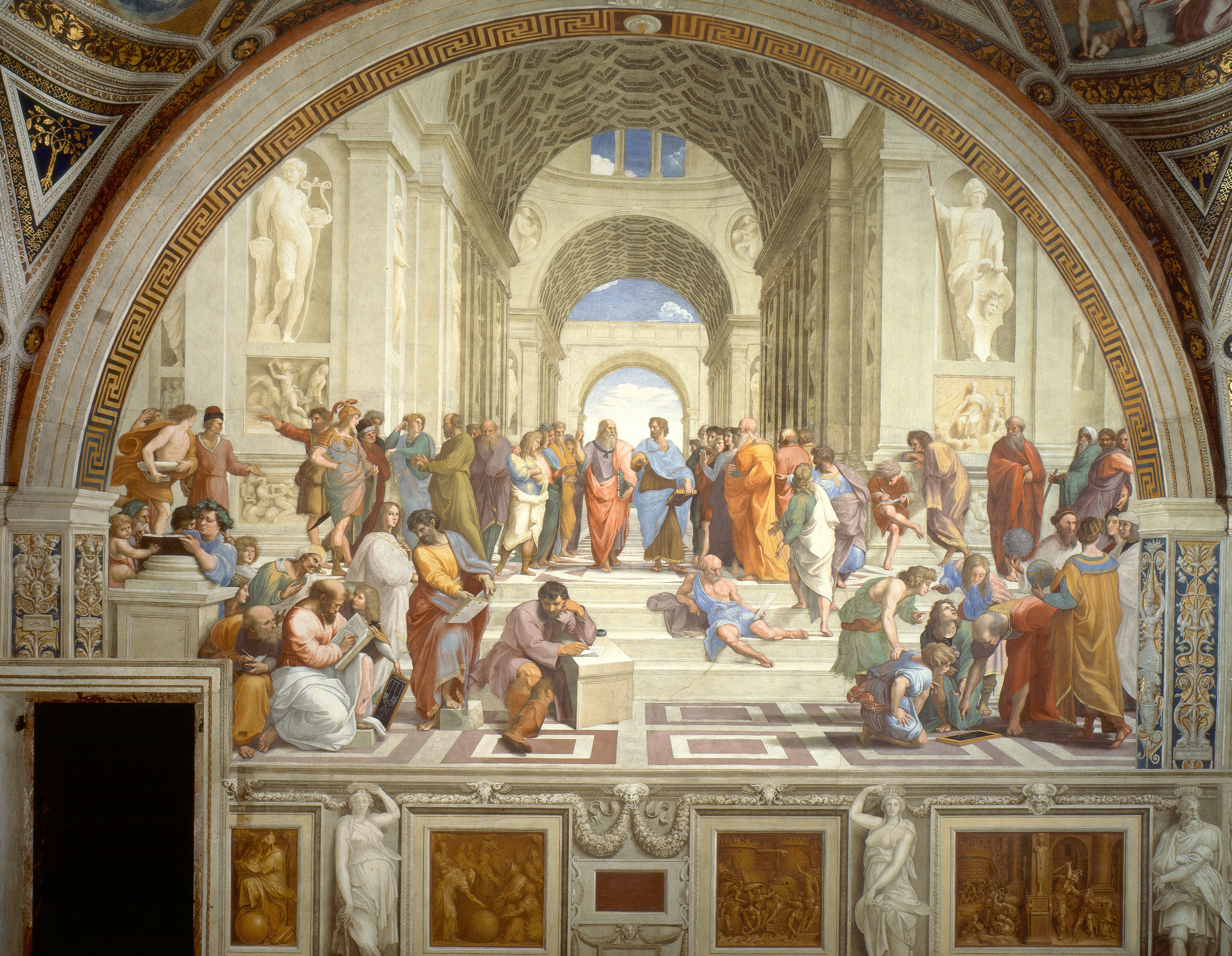
The School of Athens; by Raphael; 1509–1510; fresco; 5.8 x 8.2 m; Apostolic Palace (Vatican City)

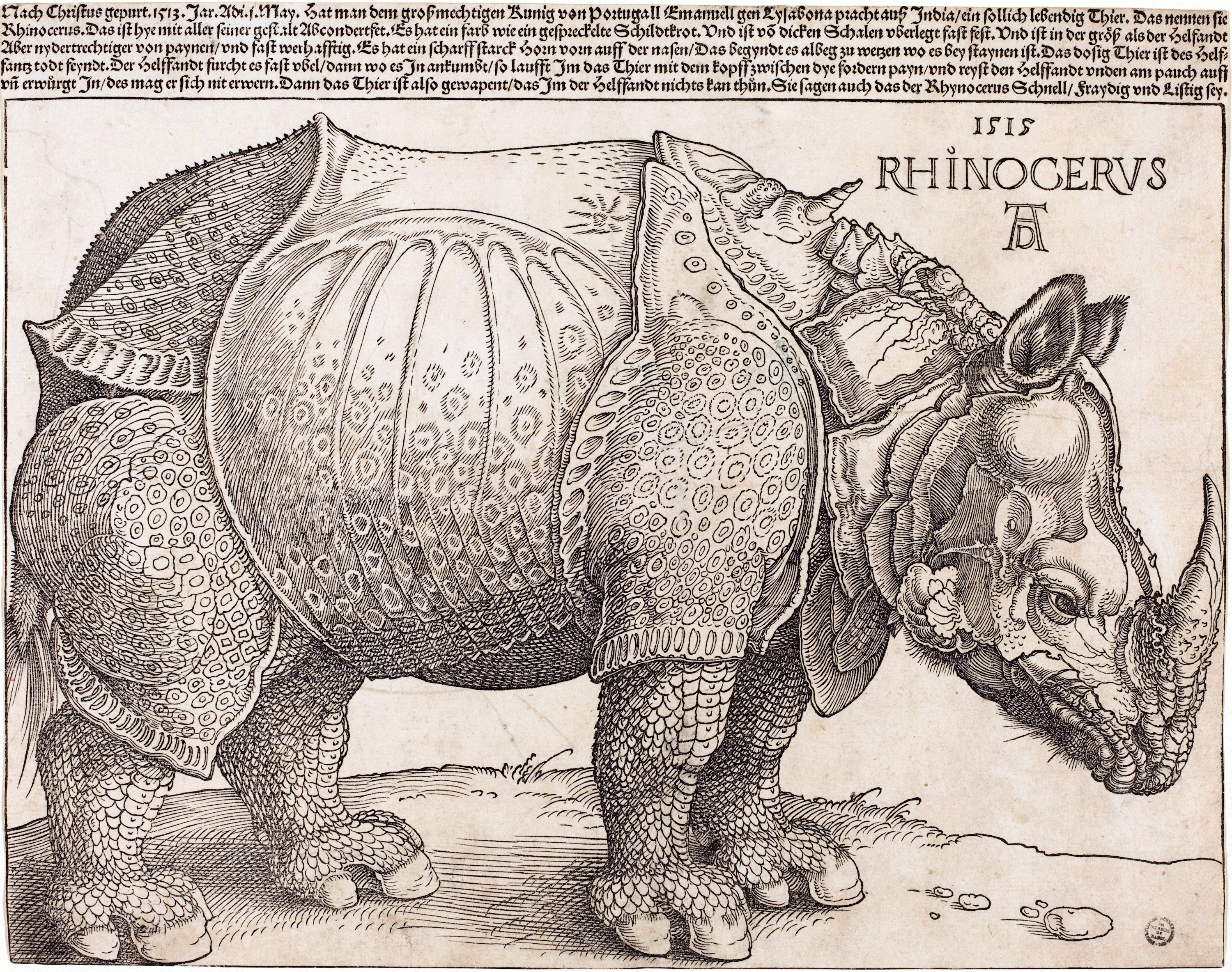
The Rhinoceros; by Albrecht Dürer; 1515; woodcut; 23.5 × 29.8 cm; National Gallery of Art (Washington, D.C., US)

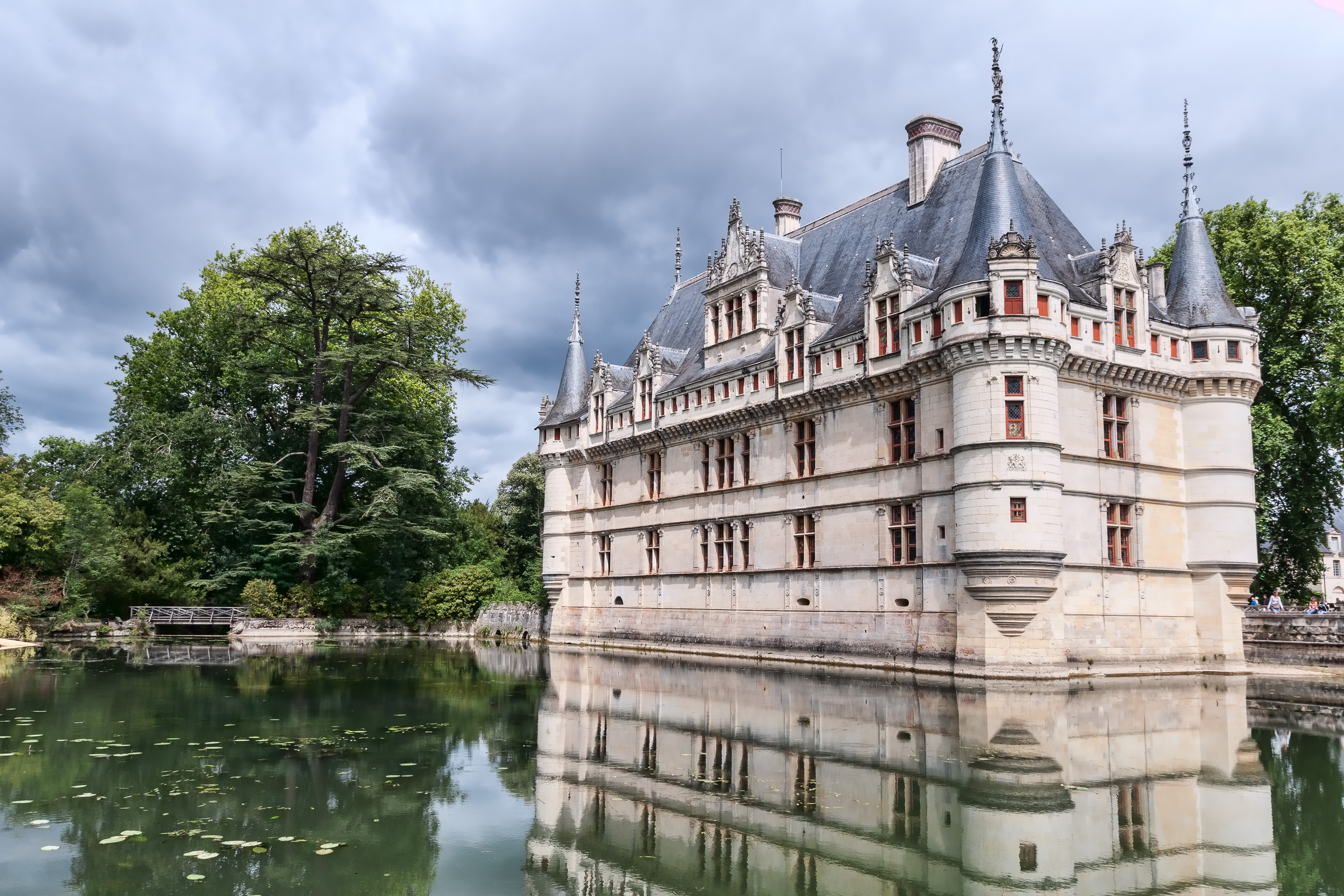
Château d'Azay-le-Rideau (Loire, France), 1518-1527

The Tower of Babel; by Pieter Bruegel the Elder; 1563; oil on panel; 1.14 x 1.55 m; Kunsthistorisches Museum (Vienna, Austria)

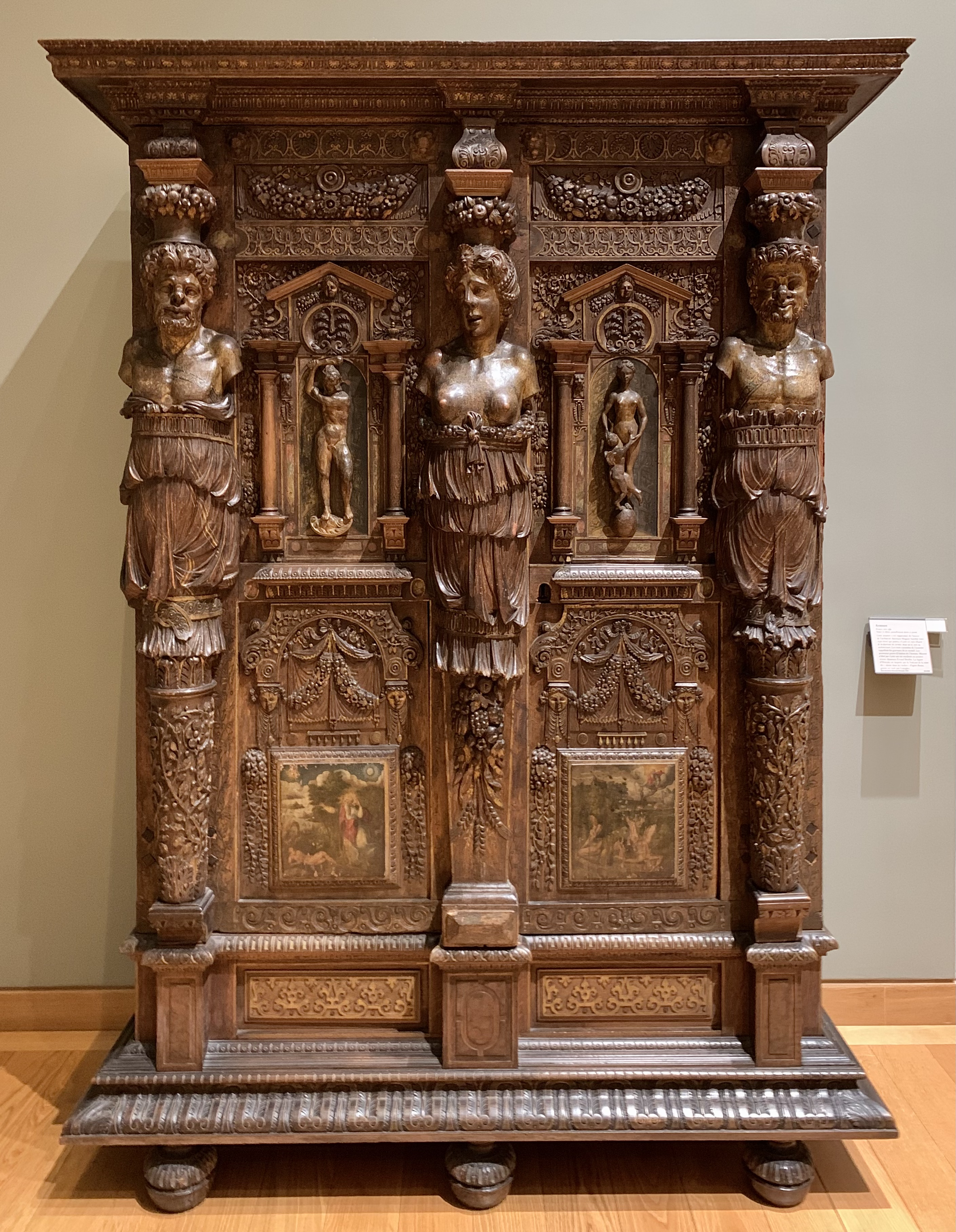
Cupboard; c. 1580; walnut and oak, partially gilded and painted; height: 2.06 m, width: 1.50 m; Louvre

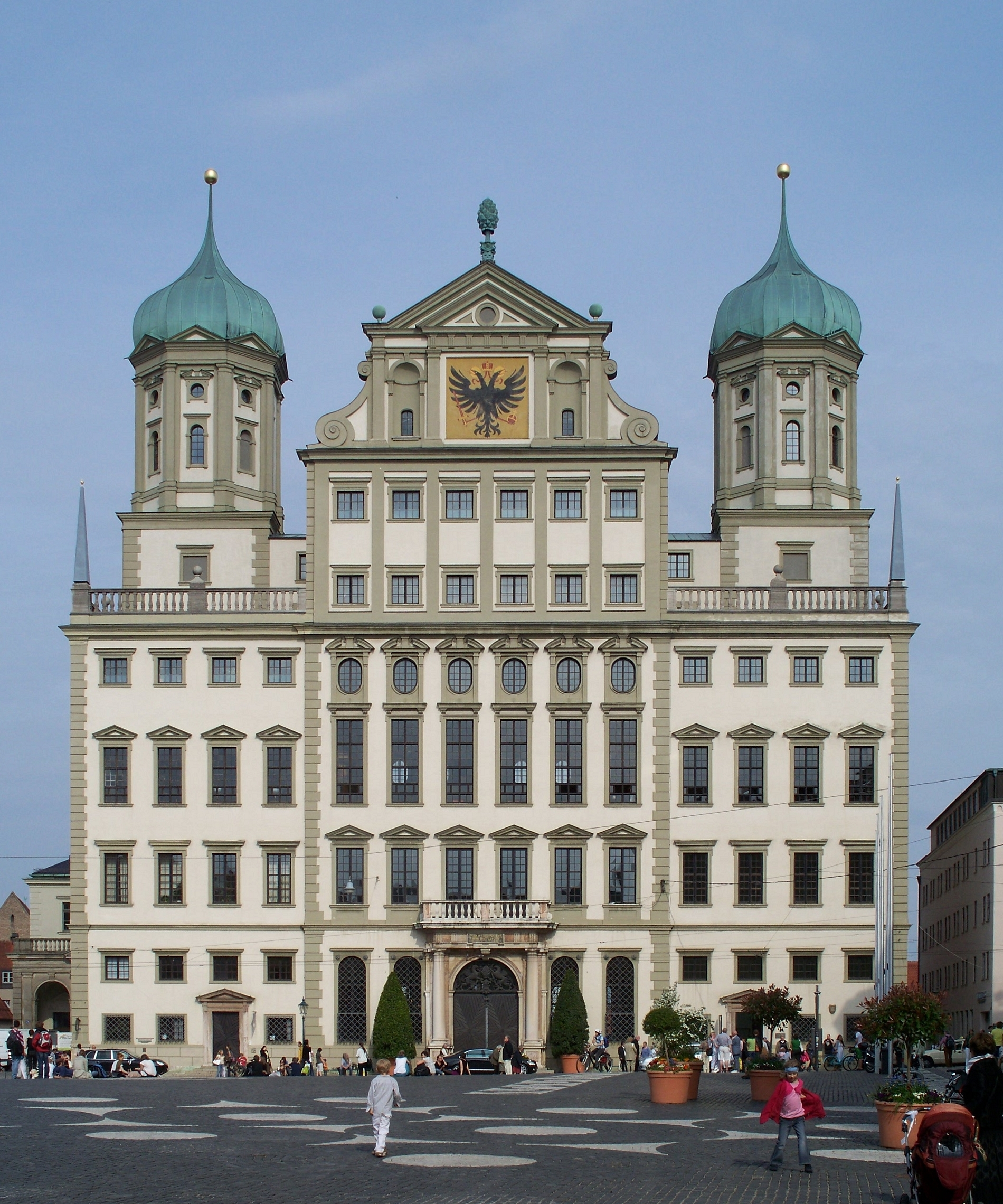
The Augsburg Town Hall (Augsburg, Germany), 1615–1624, by Elias Holl

=== Baroque ===
The Palace of Versailles (Versailles, France), one of the most iconic Baroque buildings, c. 1660 – 1715, by Louis Le Vau and Jules Hardouin-Mansart

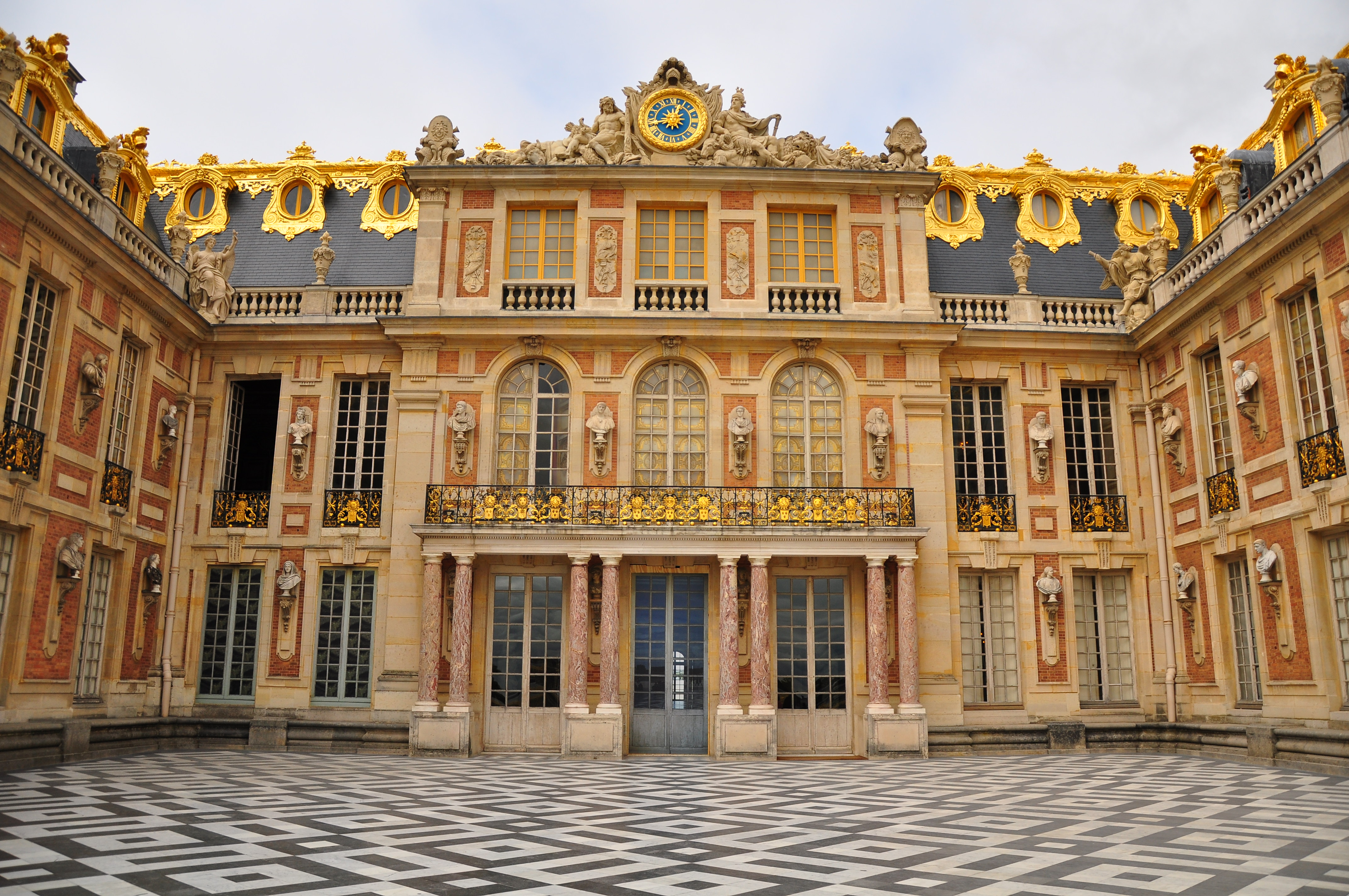
The Marble Court

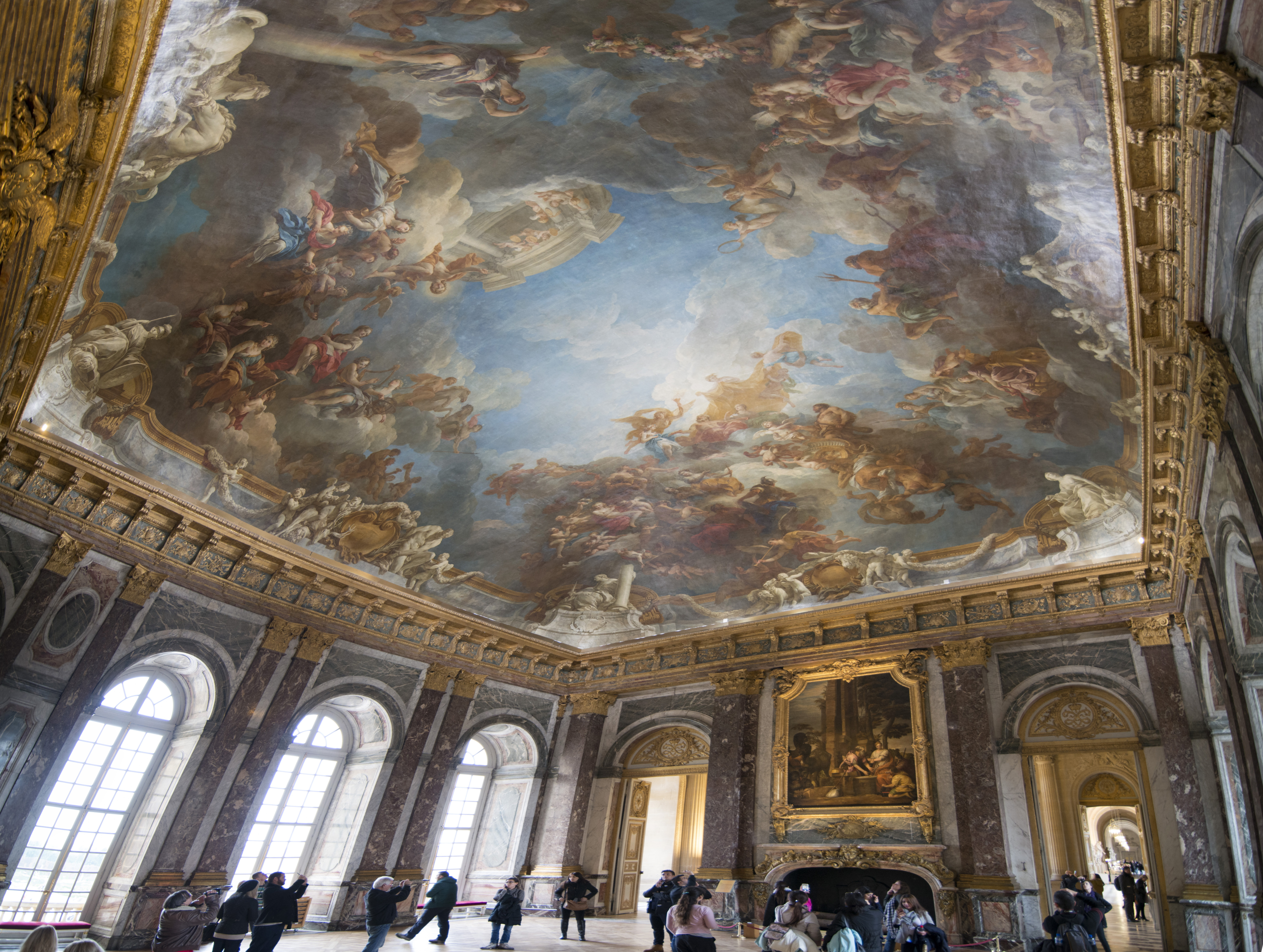
The Salon d'Hercule

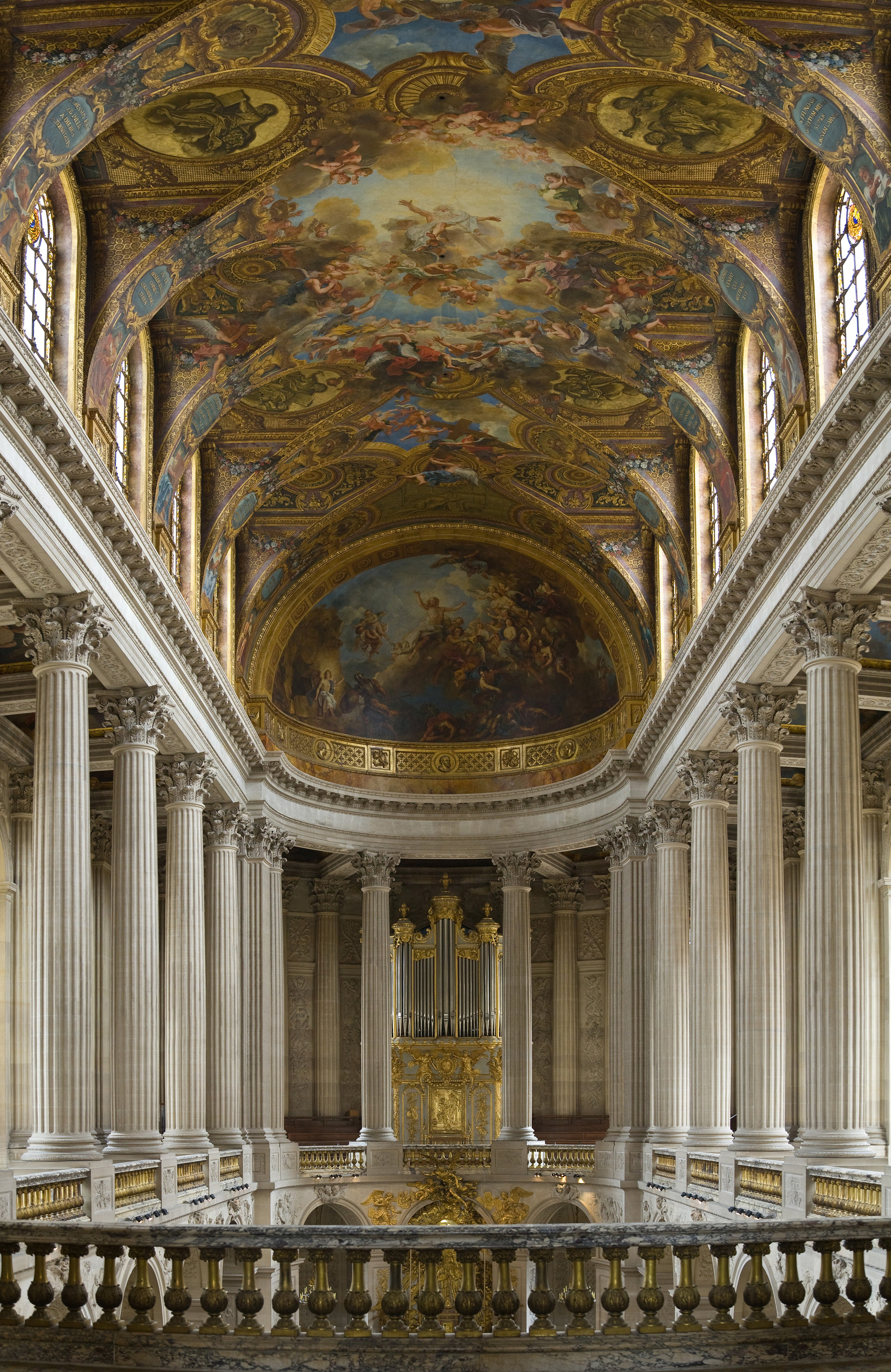
The Royal Chapel

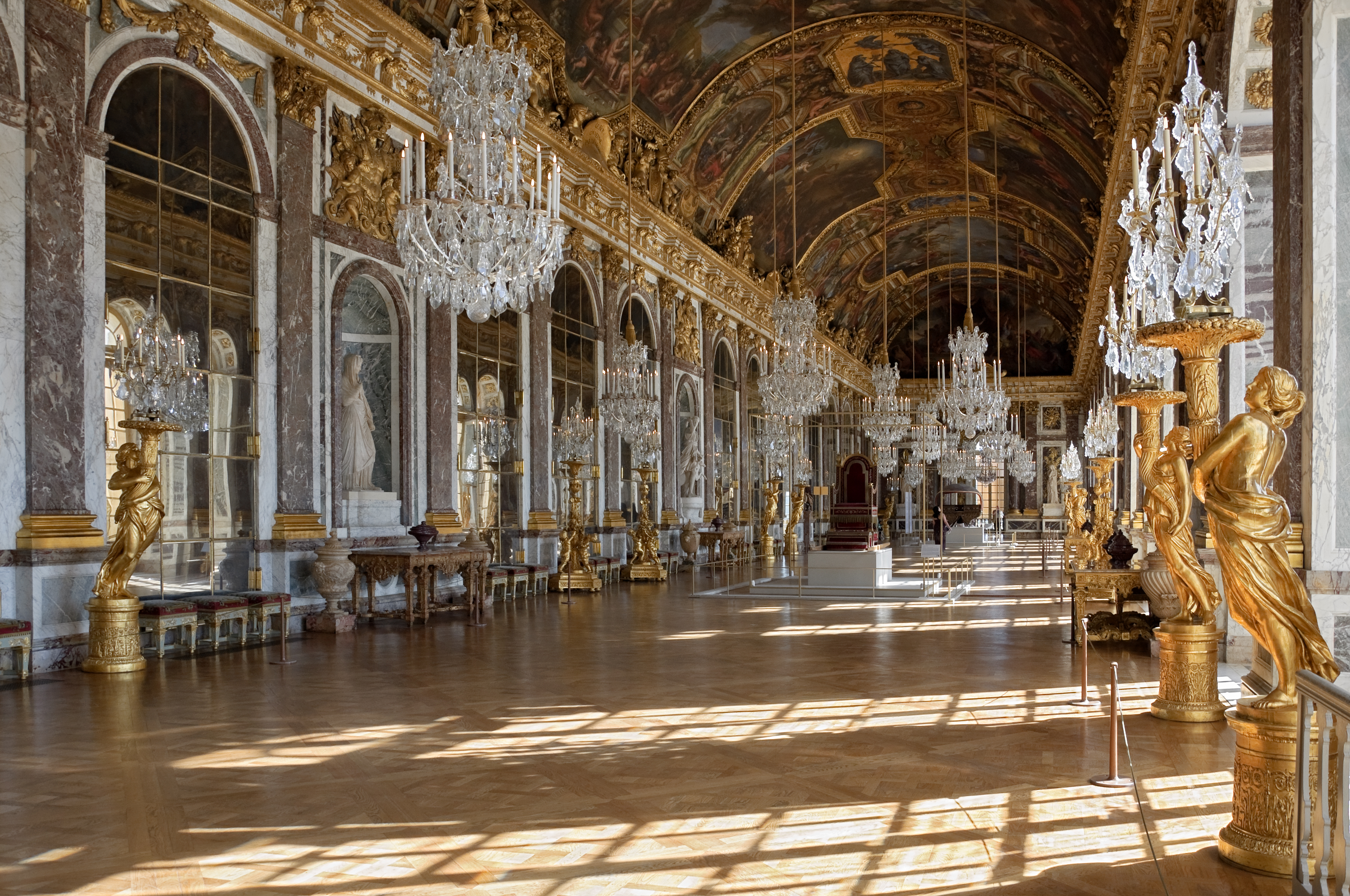
The Hall of Mirrors

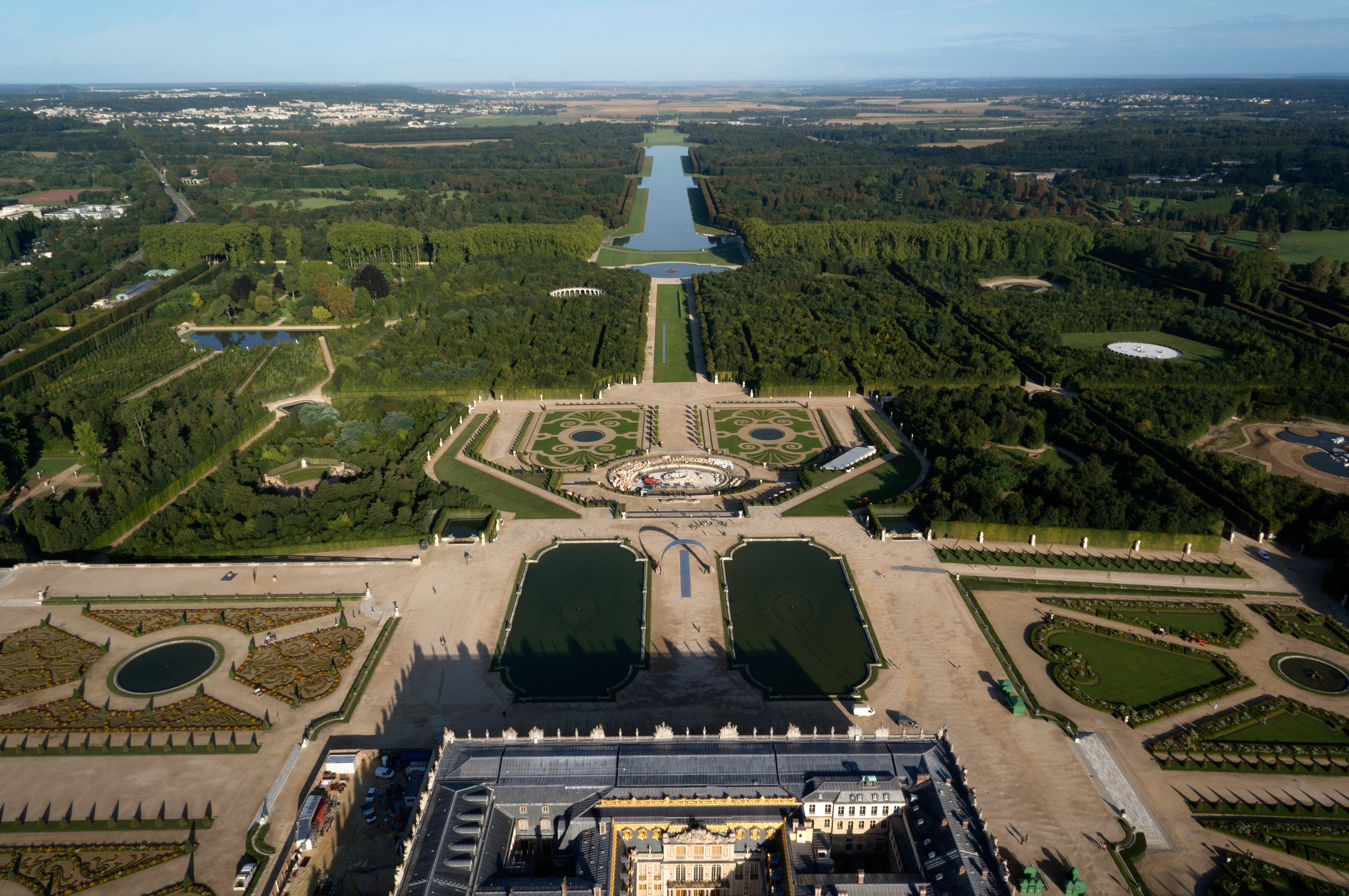
The gardens

The 17th century was a period of volatile change, both in science, through inventions and developments, such as the telescope or the microscope, and in religion, as the Catholic Counter-Reformation contested the growing popularity of Protestant faith. After the Protestant Reformation the Catholic Church reacted with the Counter-Reformation, decreeing that art should inspire viewers with passionate religious themes.

Succeeding Mannerism, and developing as a result of religious tensions across Europe, Baroque art emerged in the late 16th century. The name may derive from 'barocco', the Portuguese word for misshaped pearl, and it describes art that combined emotion, dynamism and drama with powerful color, realism and strong tonal contrasts. Between 1545 and 1563 at the Council of Trent, it was decided that religious art must encourage piety, realism and accuracy, and, by attracting viewers' attention and empathy, glorify the Catholic Church and strengthen the image of Catholicism. In the next century the radical new styles of Baroque art both embraced and developed High Renaissance models, and broke new ground both in religious art and in new varieties of secular art – above all landscape. The Baroque and its late variant the Rococo were the first truly global styles in the arts, dominating more than two centuries of art and architecture in Europe, Latin America and beyond from circa 1580 to circa 1750. Born in the painting studios of Bologna and Rome in the 1580s and 1590s, and in Roman sculptural and architectural ateliers in the second and third decades of the 17th century, the Baroque spread swiftly throughout Italy, Spain and Portugal, Flanders, France, the Netherlands, England, Scandinavia, and Russia, as well as to central and eastern European centres from Munich (Germany) to Vilnius (Lithuania). The Portuguese, Spanish and French empires and the Dutch trading network had a leading role in spreading the two styles into the Americas and colonial Africa and Asia, to places such as Lima, Mozambique, Goa and the Philippines.

Just like paintings and sculptures, Baroque cathedrals and palaces are characterised by the use of illusion and drama as well. They also frequently use dramatic effects of light and shade, and have sumptuous, highly decorated interiors that blurred the boundaries between architecture, painting and sculpture. Another important characteristic of Baroque architecture was the presence of dynamism, done through curves, Solomonic columns and ovals. In France, Baroque is synonymous with the reign of Louis XIV between 1643 and 1715, since multiple monumental buildings were built in Paris, Versailles and other parts of France during his rule, such as the Palace of Versailles, the Château de Maisons, the Château de Vaux-le-Vicomte, the Louvre Colonnade or The Dôme des Invalides. Besides the building itself, the space where it was placed has a role too. Baroque buildings try to seize viewers' attention and to dominate their surroundings, whether on a small scale such as the San Carlo alle Quattro Fontane in Rome, or on a massive one, like the new facade of the Santiago de Compostela Cathedral, designed to tower over the city. Applied arts prospered during this period as well. Baroque furniture could be as bombastic as the rooms they were meant to adorn, and their motifs and techniques were carefully calibrated to coordinate with the architect's overall decorative programme. One of the most prestigious furniture makers was André Charles Boulle, known for his marquetry technique, made by gluing sheets of tortoiseshell and brass together and cut to form the design. His works were also adorned with gilded bronze mounts. Complex Gobelins tapestries featured scenes inspired by classical antiquity, and the Savonnerie manufactory produced big highly detailed carpets for the Louvre. These carpets with black or yellow backgrounds had a central motif or a medallion. Chinese porcelain, Delftware and mirrors fabricated at Saint-Gobain (France) spread rapidly in all princely palaces and aristocratic residences in France. During the reign of Louis XIV, big mirrors are put above fireplace mantels, and this trend will last long after the Baroque period.

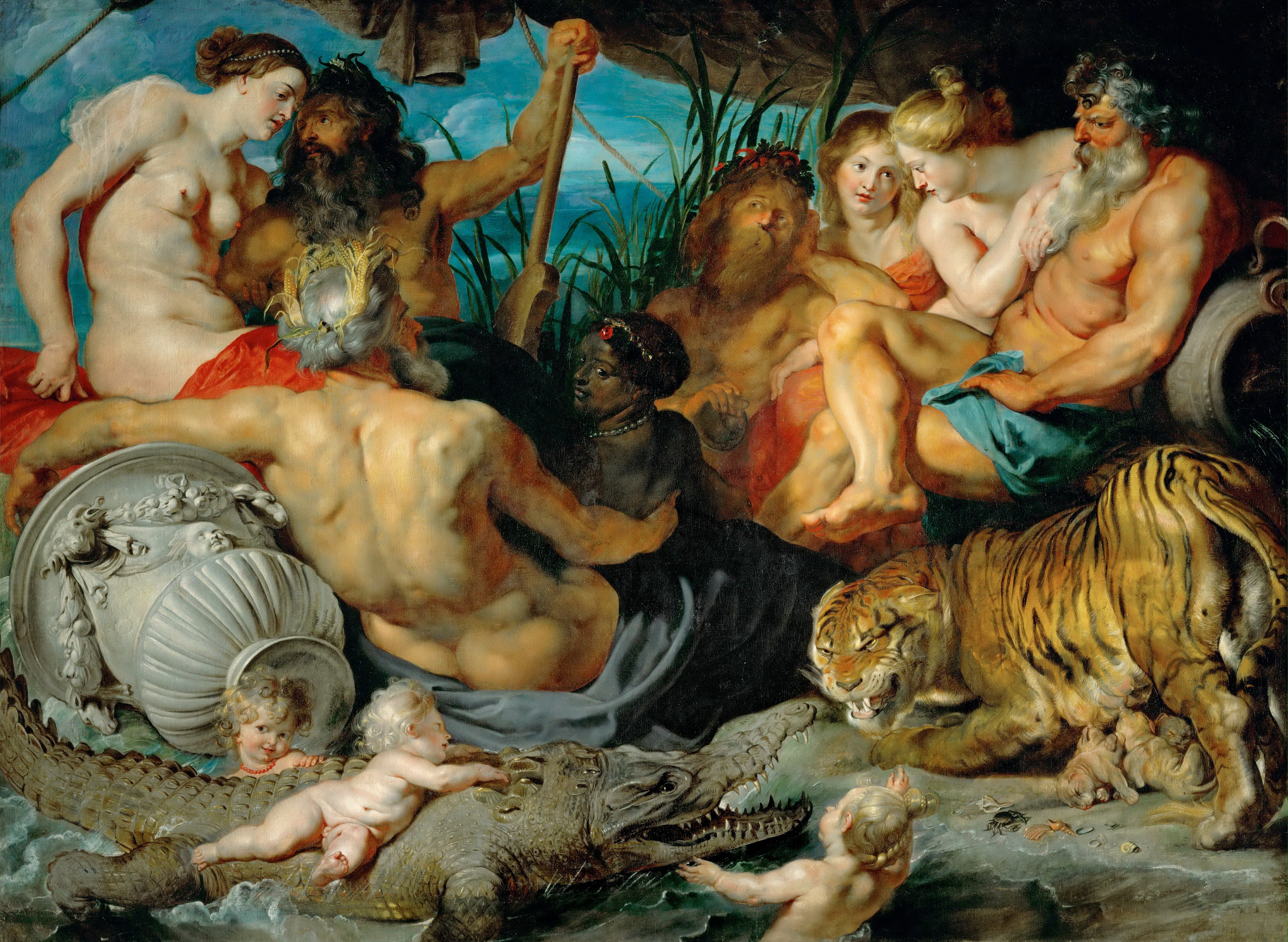
The Four Continents; by Peter Paul Rubens; c.1615; oil on canvas; 209 x 284 cm; Kunsthistorisches Museum (Vienna, Austria)

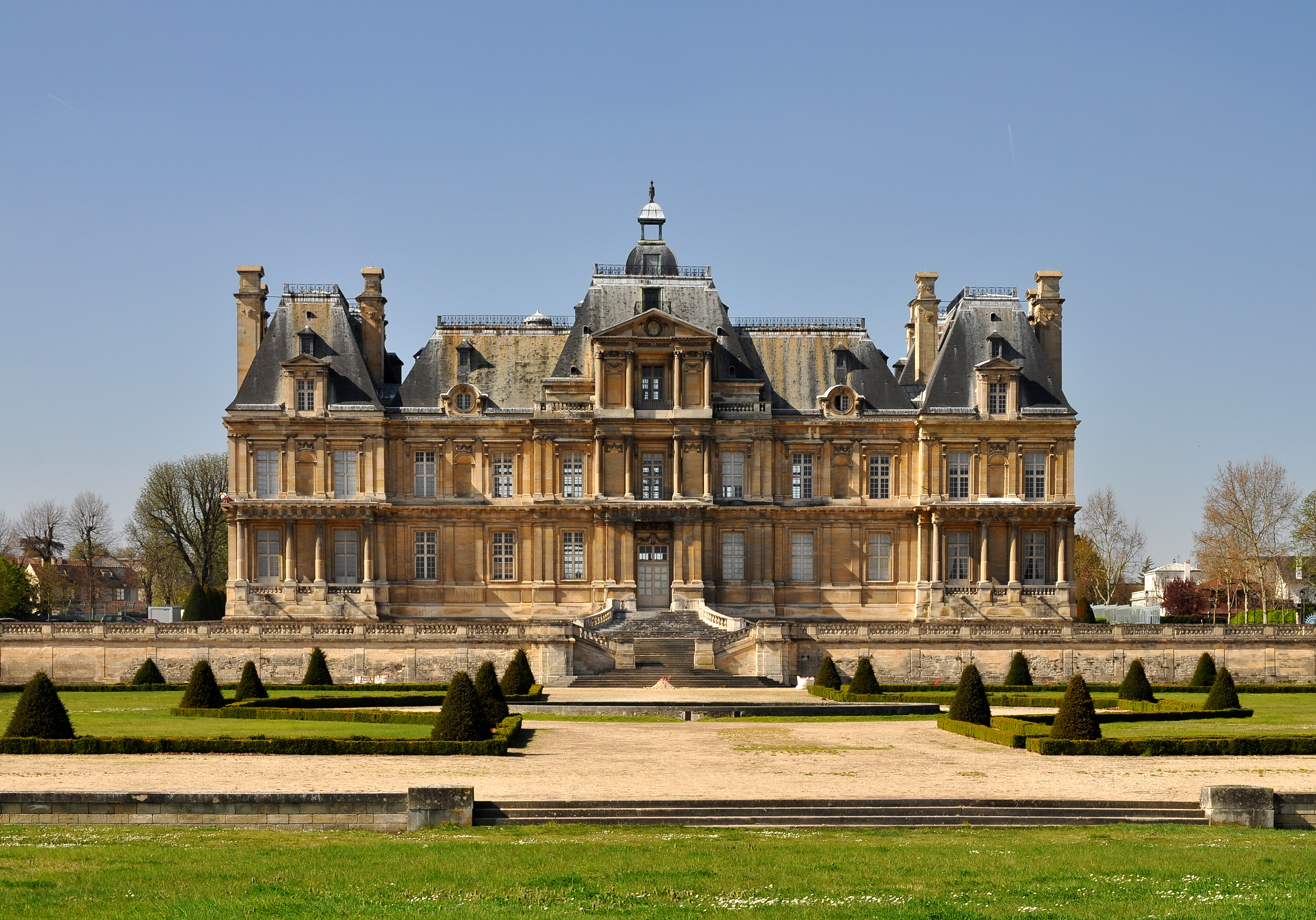
Château de Maisons (France), by François Mansart, 1630-1651

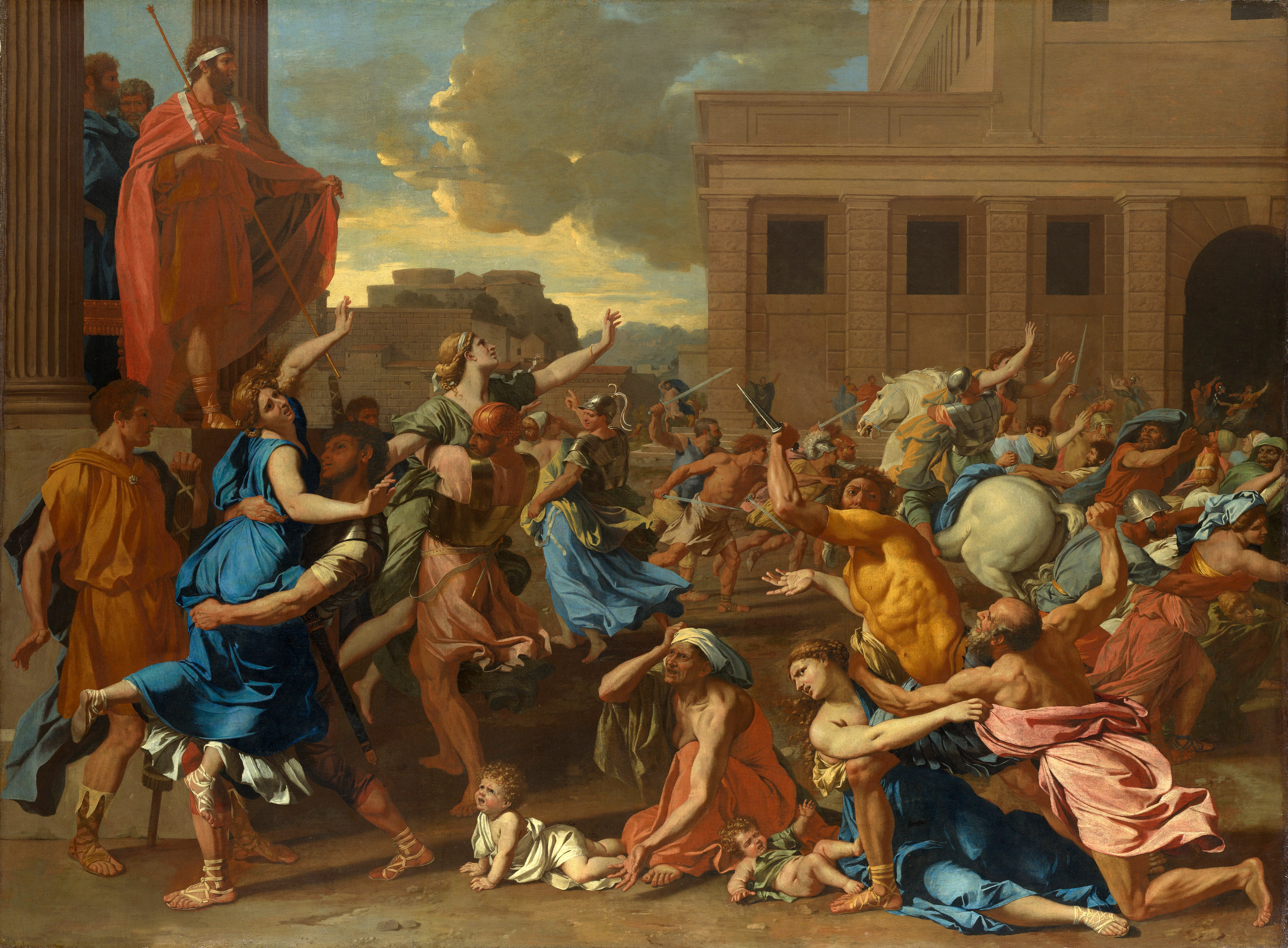
The Rape of the Sabine Women; by Nicolas Poussin; 1634–1635; oil on canvas; 1.55 × 2.1 m; Metropolitan Museum of Art (New York City)

The Night Watch; by Rembrandt; 1642; oil on canvas; 3.63 × 4.37 m; Rijksmuseum (Amsterdam, the Netherlands)

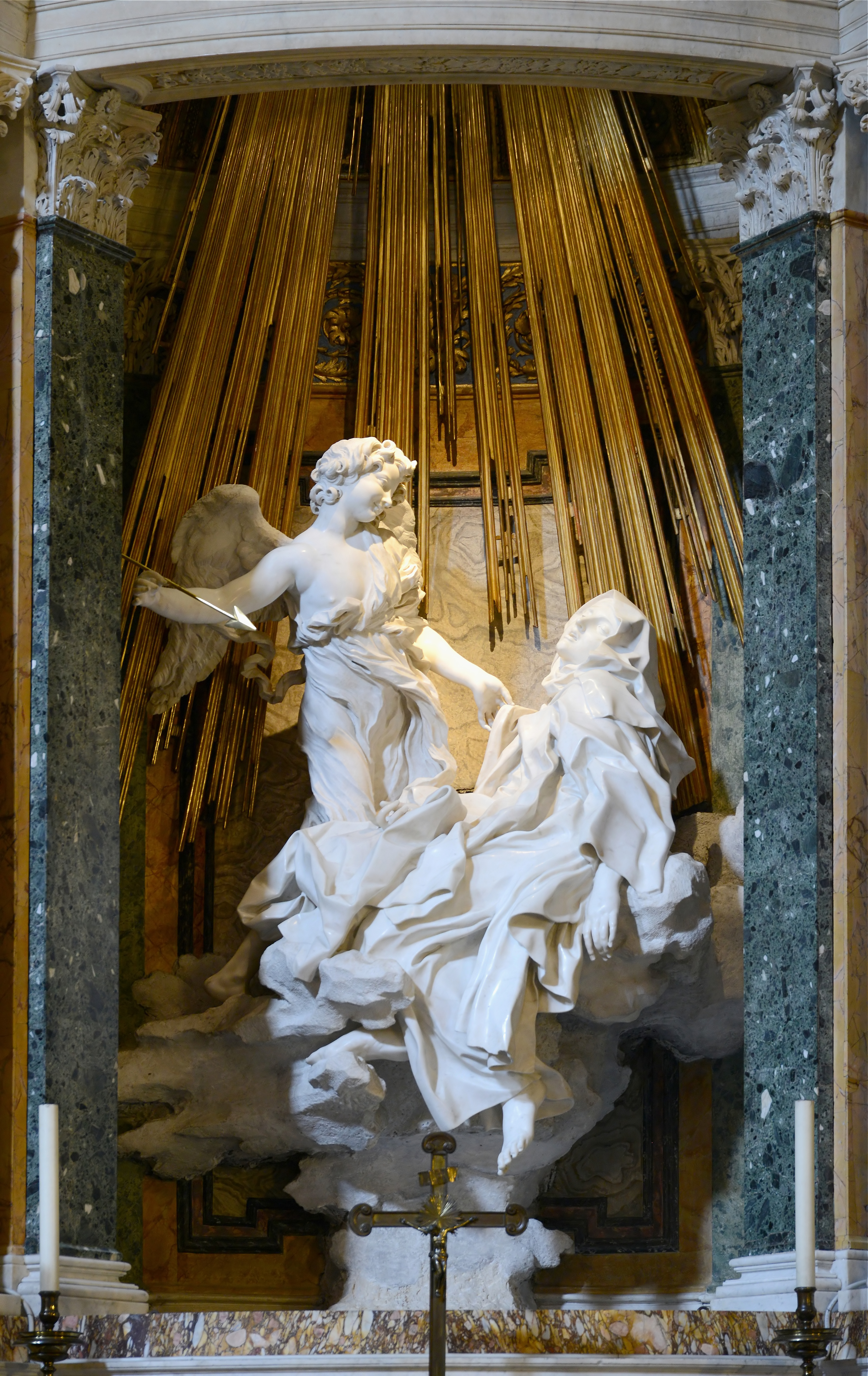
Ecstasy of Saint Teresa; by Gian Lorenzo Bernini; 1647–1652; marble; height: 3.5 m; Santa Maria della Vittoria (Rome)

Las Meninas; by Diego Velázquez; 1656; oil on canvas; 318 cm × 2.76 m; Museo del Prado (Madrid, Spain)

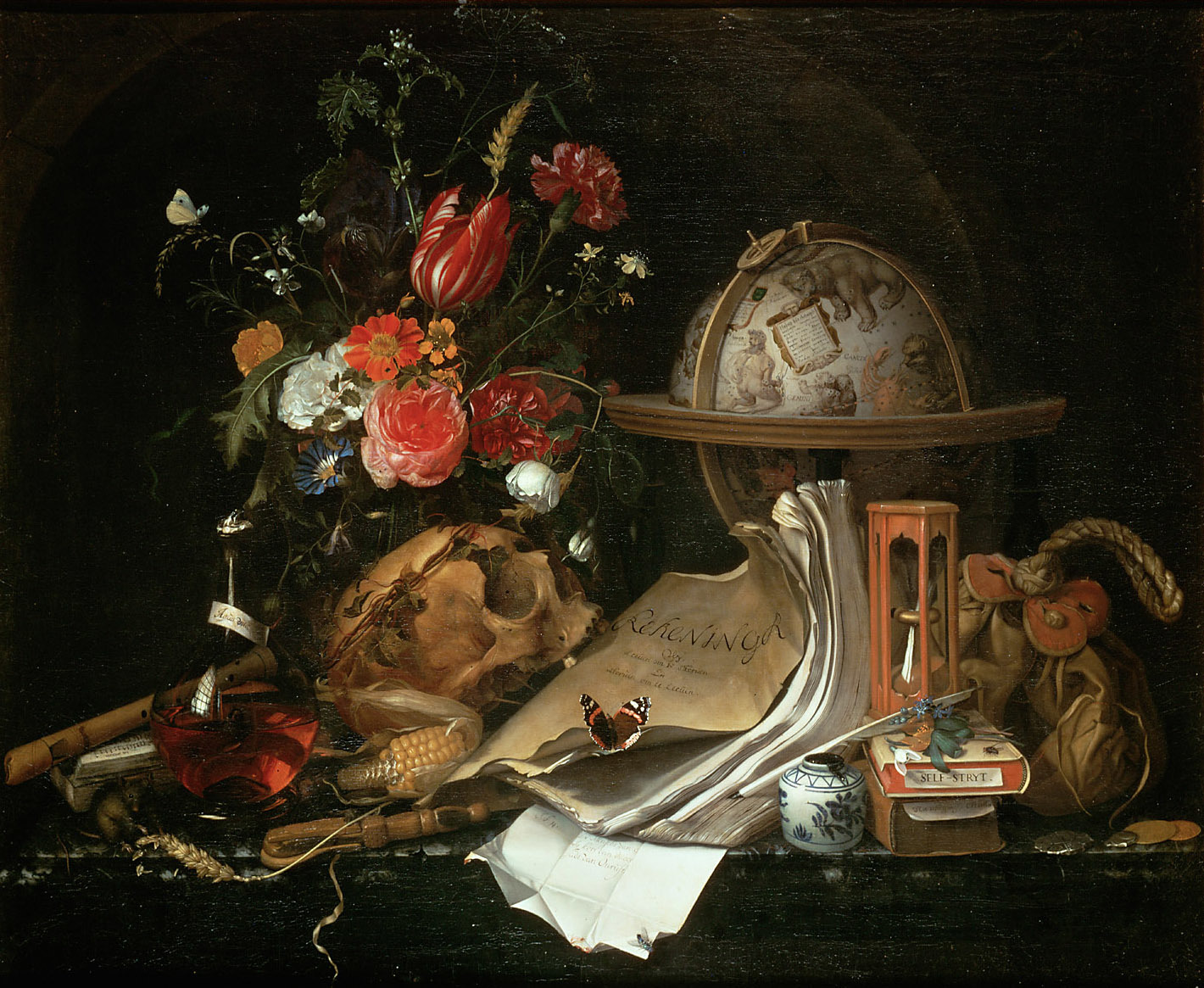
Vanitas Still Life; by Maria van Oosterwijck; 1668; oil on canvas; 73 x 88.5 cm; Kunsthistorisches Museum

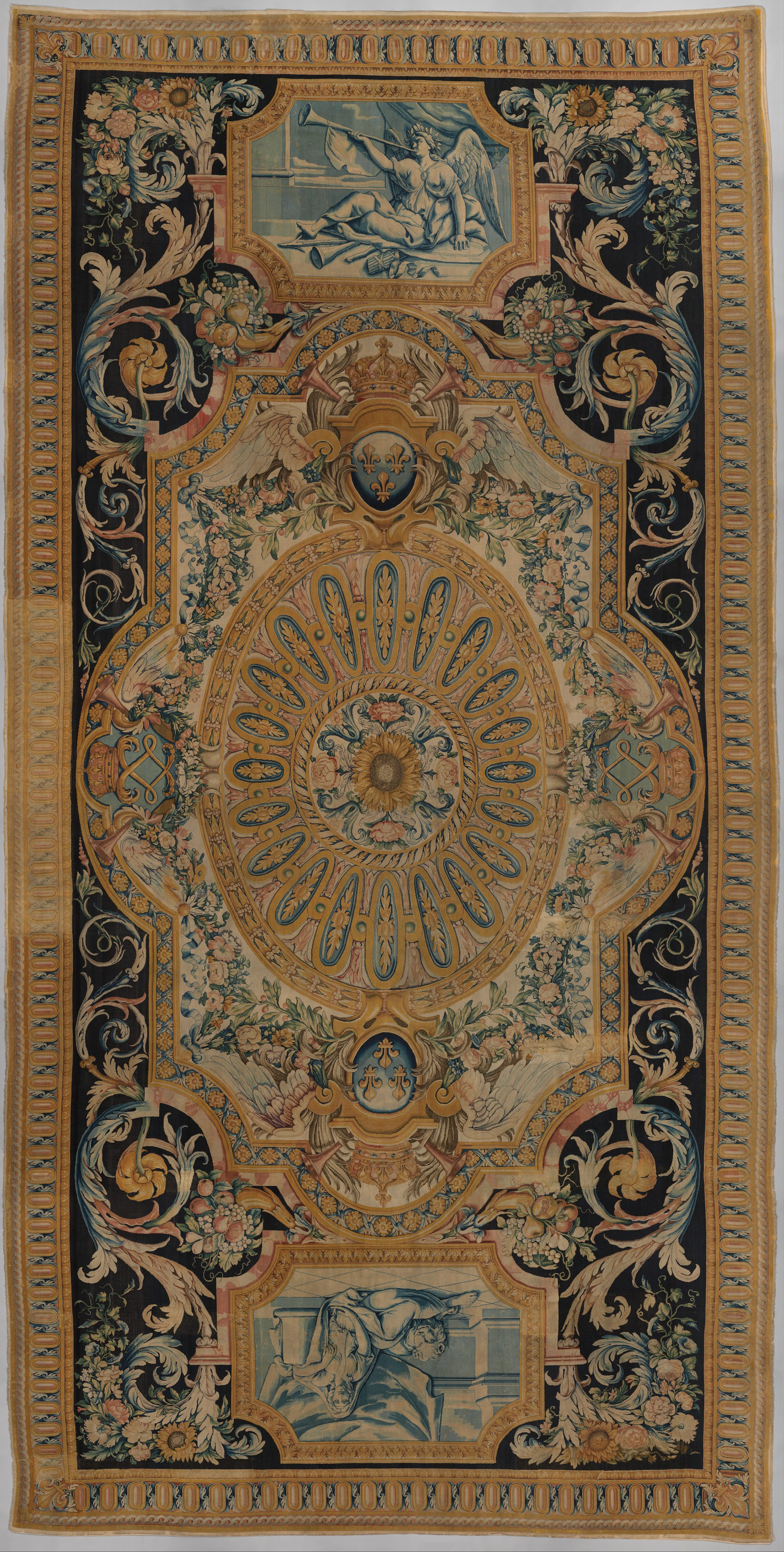
Carpet with fame and fortitude; by the Savonnerie manufactory; 1668–1685; knotted and cut wool pile, woven with about 90 knots per square inch; 909.3 x 459.7 cm; Metropolitan Museum of Art

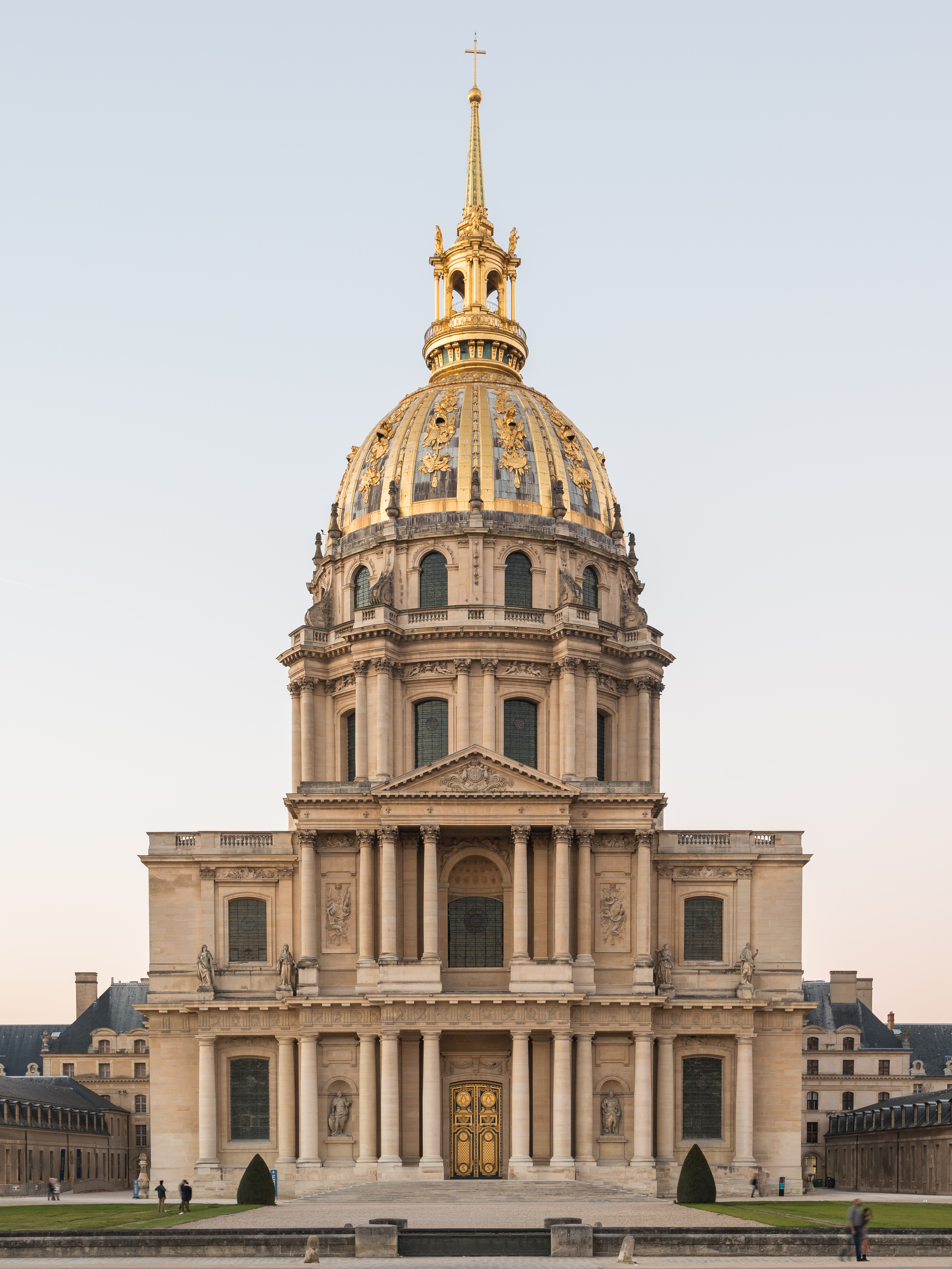
Dôme des Invalides (Paris), 1677–1706, by Jules Hardouin-Mansart

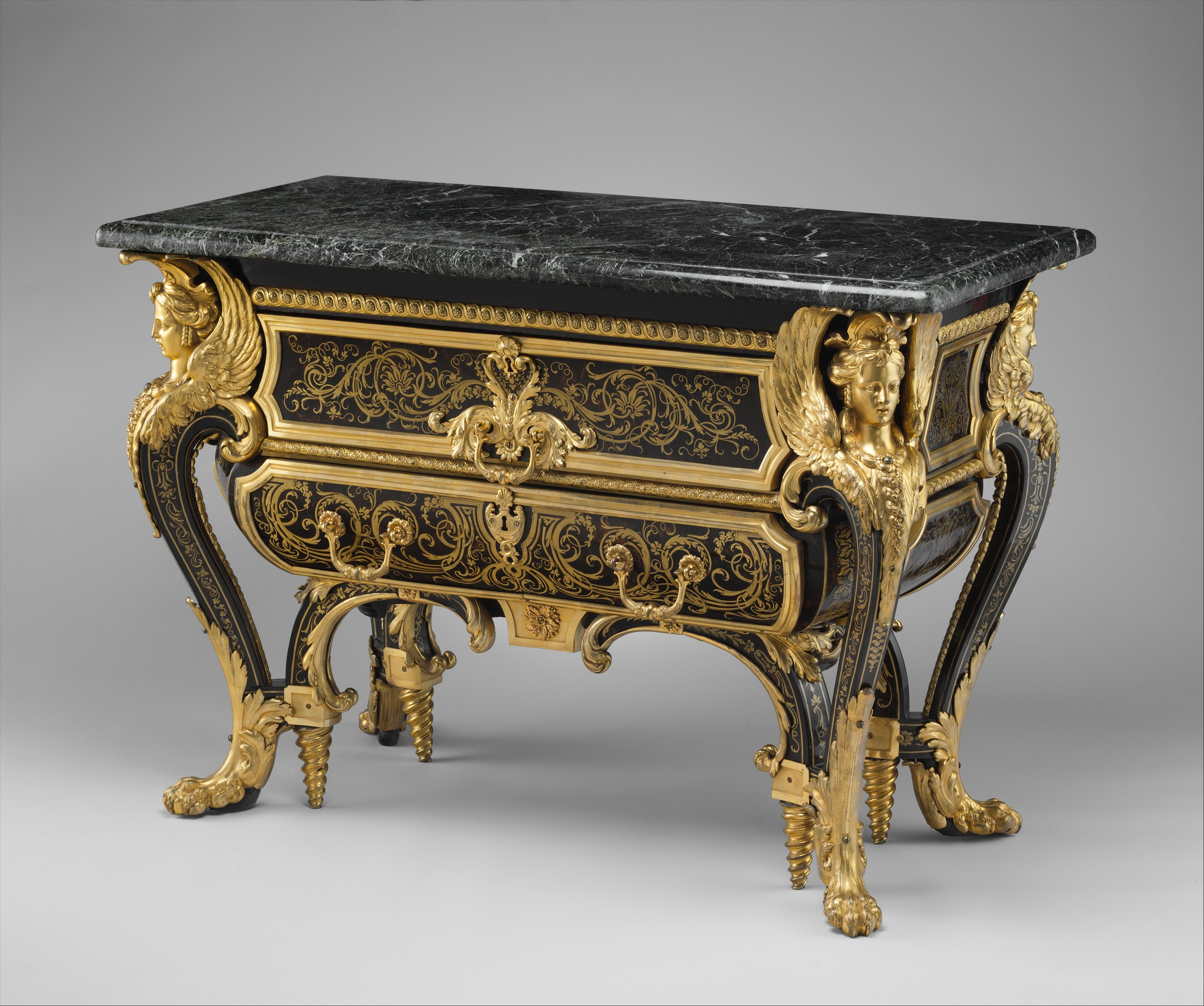
Commode; by André Charles Boulle; c. 1710–1732; walnut veneered with ebony and marquetry of engraved brass and tortoiseshell, gilt-bronze mounts, antique marble top; 87.6 x 128.3 x 62.9 cm; Metropolitan Museum of Art

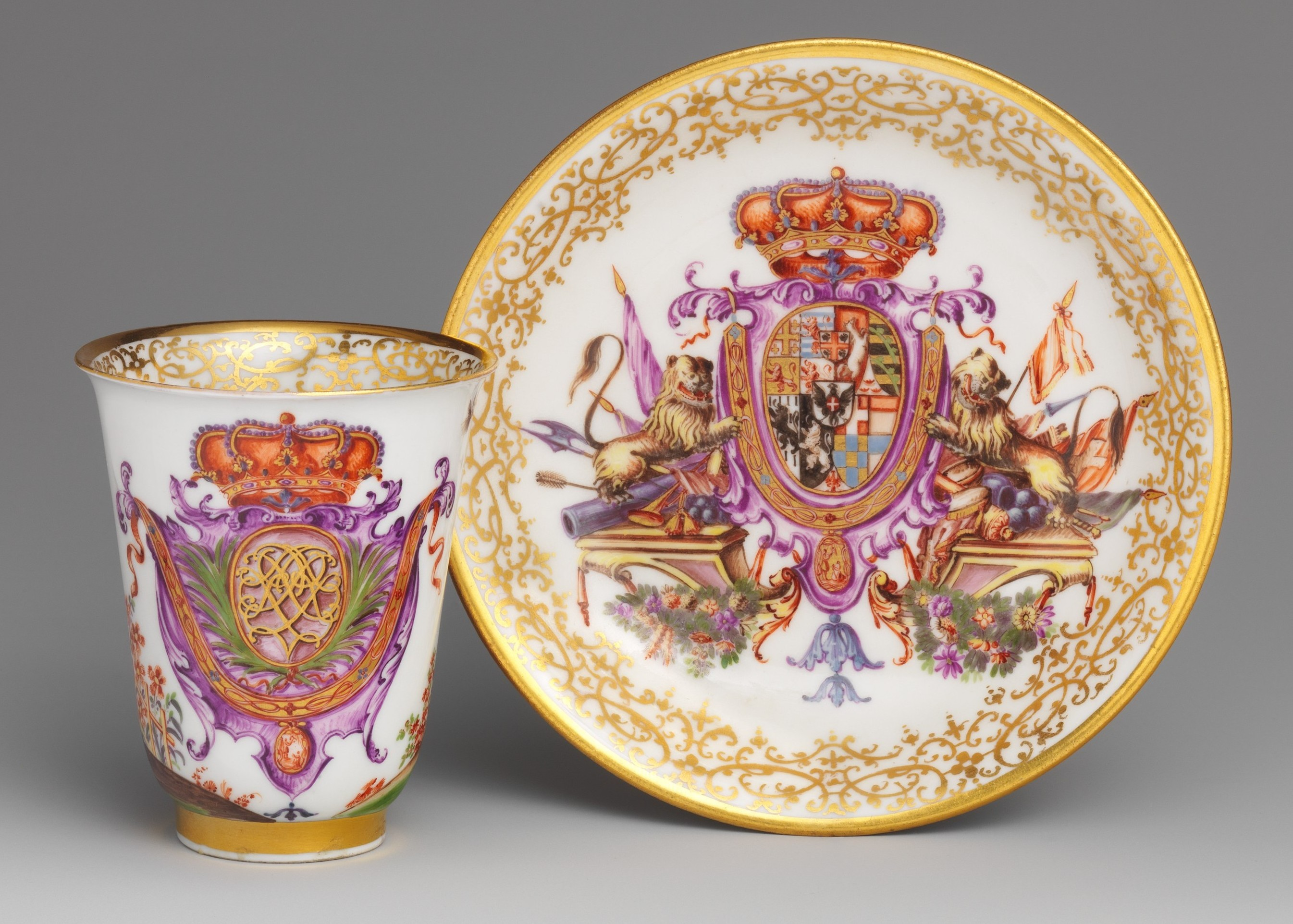
Part of a Meissen porcelain tea and chocolate service, c. 1725, given to Vittorio Amadeo II, King of Sardinia (1666–1732) by Augustus the Strong, owner of the Meissen factory

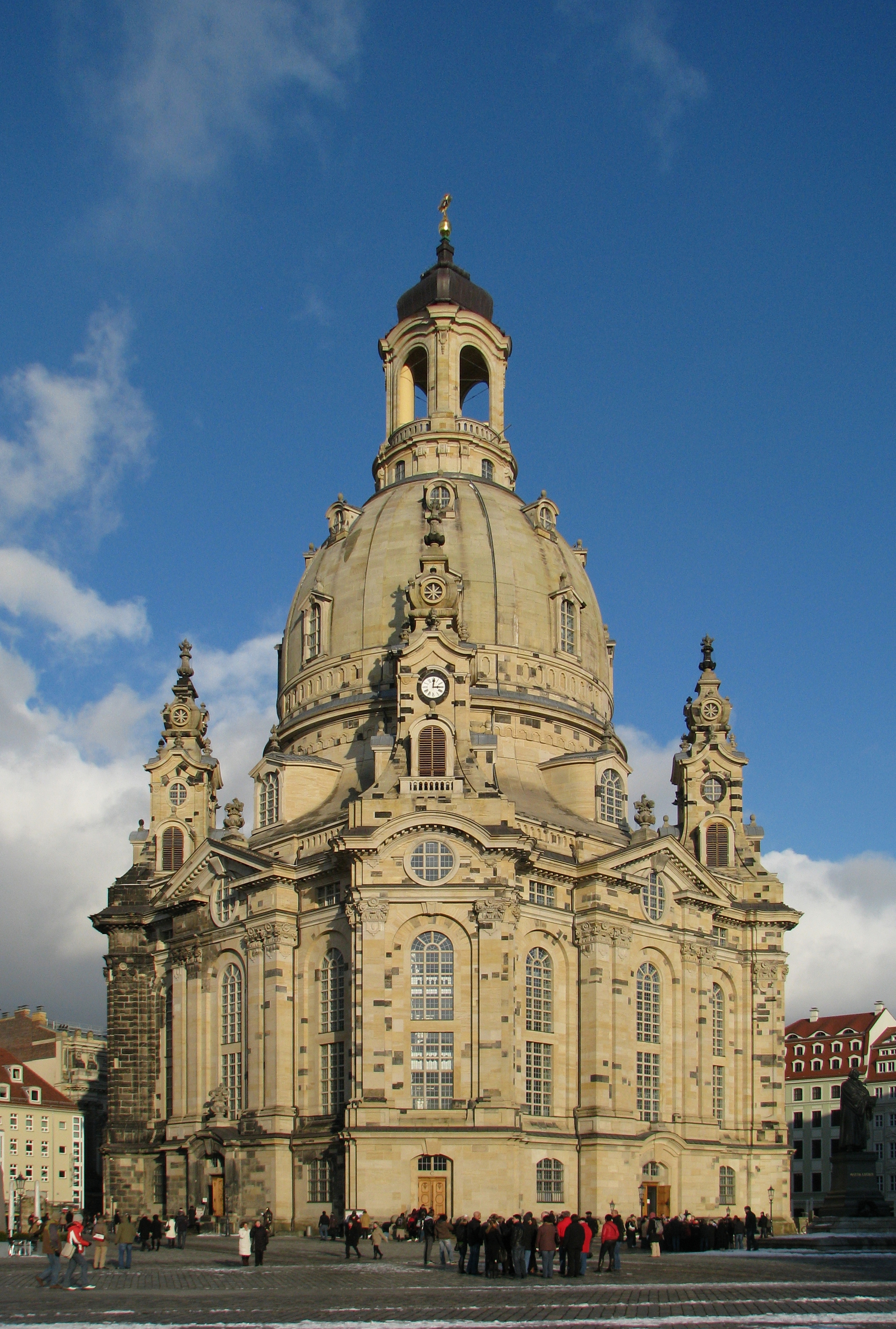
Frauenkirche in Dresden, 1726-1743, by George Bähr

=== Rococo ===
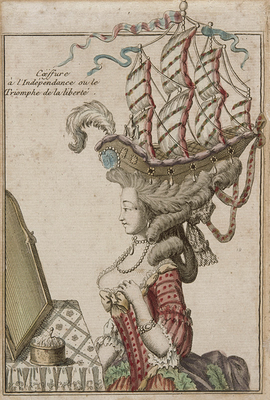
Coiffure à l’Indépendance ou Le Triomphe de la Liberté, 1778, depicting a fashionable aristocratic woman is applying the finishing touches to her toilette

Originating in c.1720 Paris, Rococo is characterized by natural motifs, soft colours, curving lines, asymmetry and themes including love, nature and light-hearted entertainment. Its ideals were delicacy, gaiety, youthfulness and sensuality.

Beginning in France as a reaction against the heavy Baroque grandeur of Louis XIV's court at the Palace of Versailles, the rococo movement became associated particularly with the powerful Madame de Pompadour (1721–1764), the mistress of the new king Louis XV (1710–1774). Because of this, the style was also known as 'Pompadour'. The name of the movement derives from the French 'rocaille', or pebble, and refers to stones and shells that decorate the interiors of caves, as similar shell forms became a common feature in Rococo design. It began as a design and decorative arts style, and was characterized by elegant flowing shapes. Architecture followed and then painting and sculpture. The French painter with whom the term Rococo is most often associated is Jean-Antoine Watteau, whose pastoral scenes, or fêtes galantes, dominate the early part of the 18th century.

Although there are some important Bavarian churches in this style, such as the Wieskirche, Rococo is most often associated with secular buildings, principally great palaces and salons where educated elites would meet to discuss literary and philosophical ideas. In Paris, its popularity coincided with the emergence of the salon as a new type of social gathering, the venues for which were often decorated in the Rococo style. Among the most characteristically elegant and refined examples is the Salon Oval de la Princesse of the Hôtel de Soubise, one of the most beautiful 18th century mansions in Paris. The Rococo introduced dramatic changes to elite furniture, as it favoured smaller pieces with narrow, sinewy frames and more delicate, often asymmetrical decoration, often including elements of chinoiserie. The taste for Far Eastern objects (mainly Chinese) lead to the use of Chinese painted and lacquered panels for furniture.

The movement spread quickly throughout Europe and as far as Ottoman Turkey and China thanks to ornament books featuring cartouches, arabesques and shell work, as well as designs for wall panels and fireplaces. The most popular were made by Juste-Aurèle Meissonnier (1695–1750), Jacques-François Blondel (1705–1774), Pierre-Edmé Babel (1720–1775) and François de Cuvilliés (1695–1768).

The Embarkation for Cythera; by Jean-Antoine Watteau; 1718; oil on canvas; 1.29 x 1.94 m; Schloss Charlottenburg

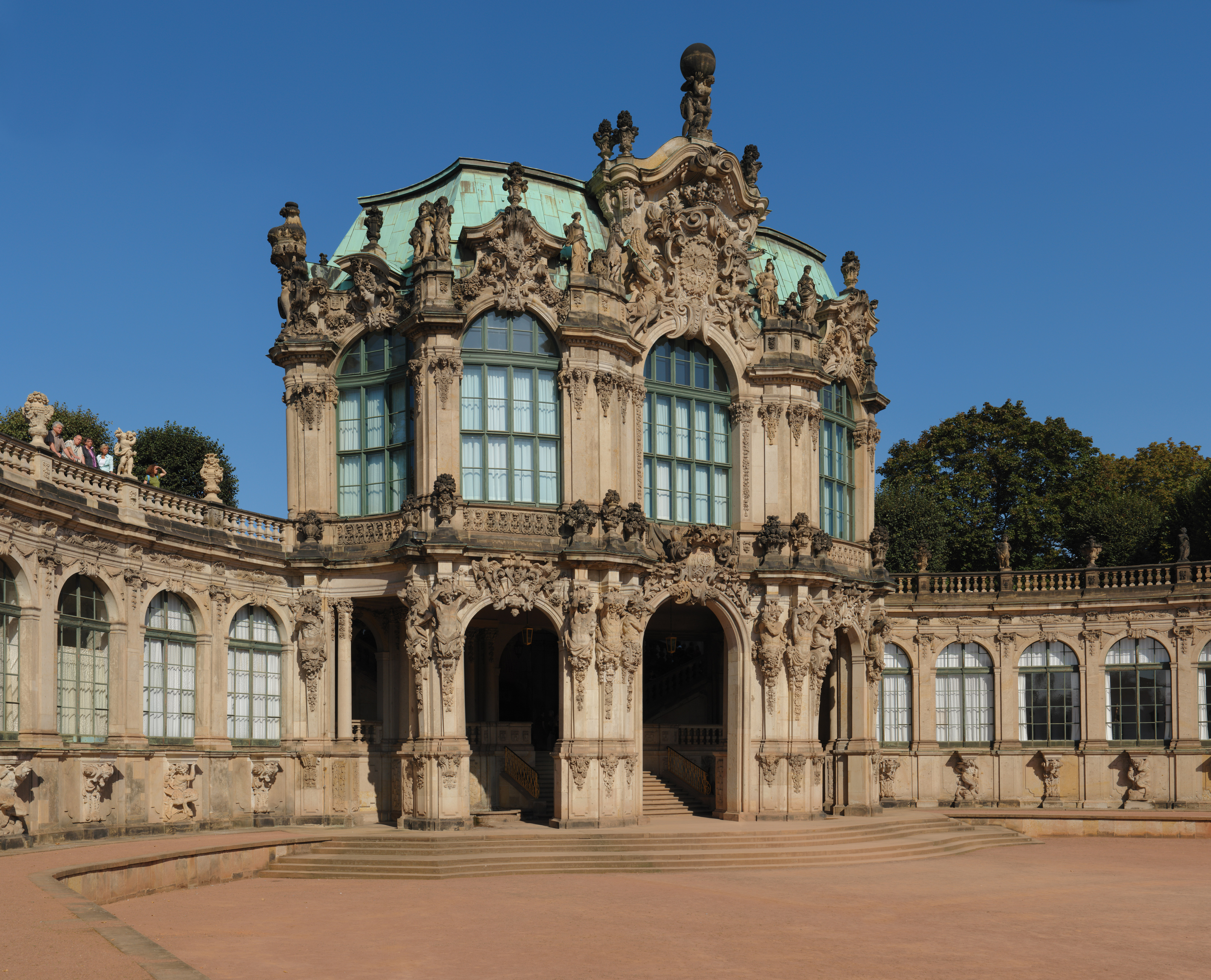
Zwinger, Dresden, Germany, by Matthäus Daniel Pöppelmann, 1719

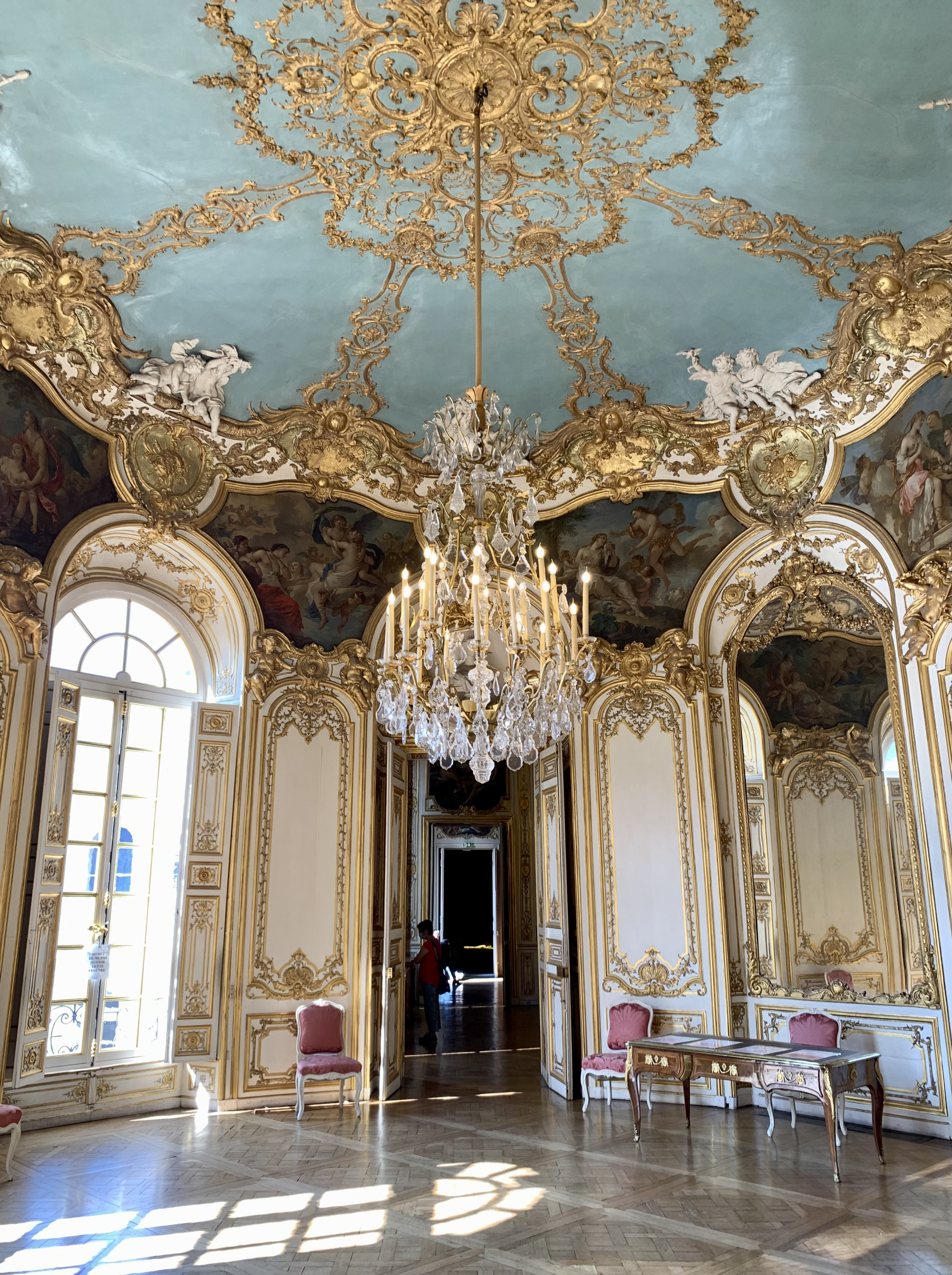
The Salon Oval de la Princesse of the Hôtel de Soubise (Paris), 1737–1739, by Germain Boffrand, Charles-Joseph Natoire and Jean-Baptiste Lemoyne

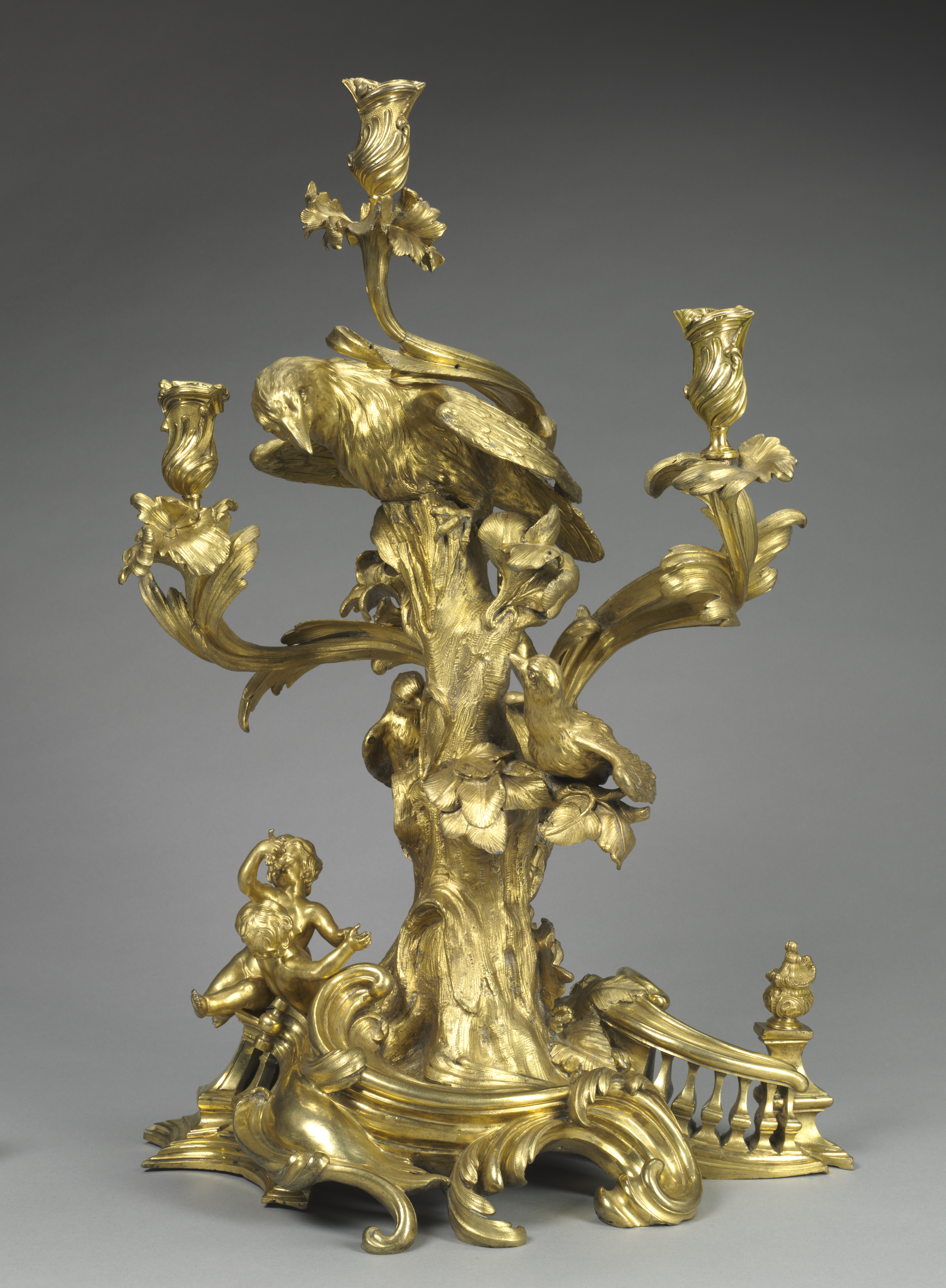
Candelabrum; by Jean Joseph de Saint-Germain; c.1750; gilt bronze; overall: 72.4 x 49.3 x 39.7 cm; Cleveland Museum of Art (Cleveland, Ohio, US)

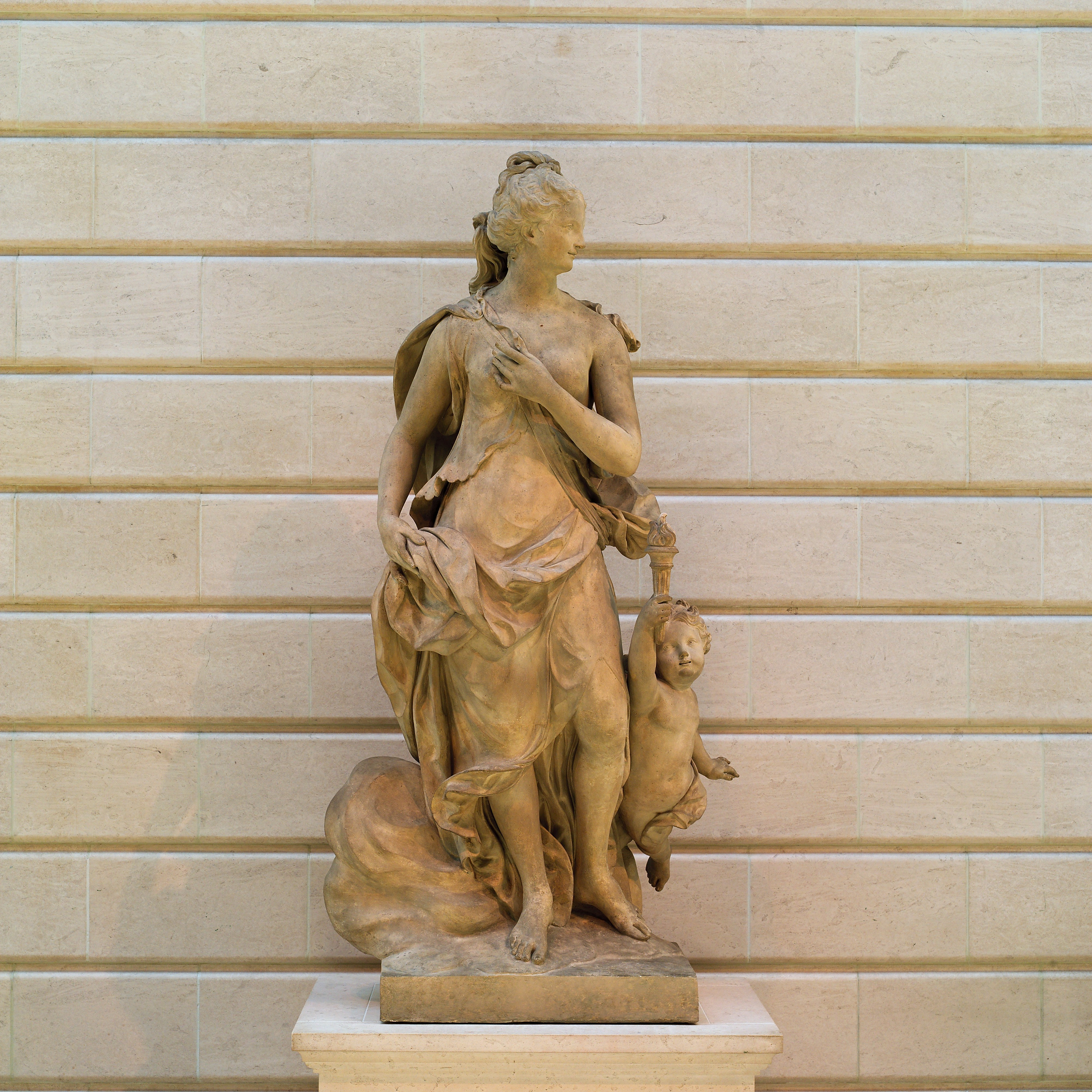
Fire; by Jean-Pierre Defrance; c.1750-1760; limestone; height: 223 cm; Metropolitan Museum of Art (New York City)

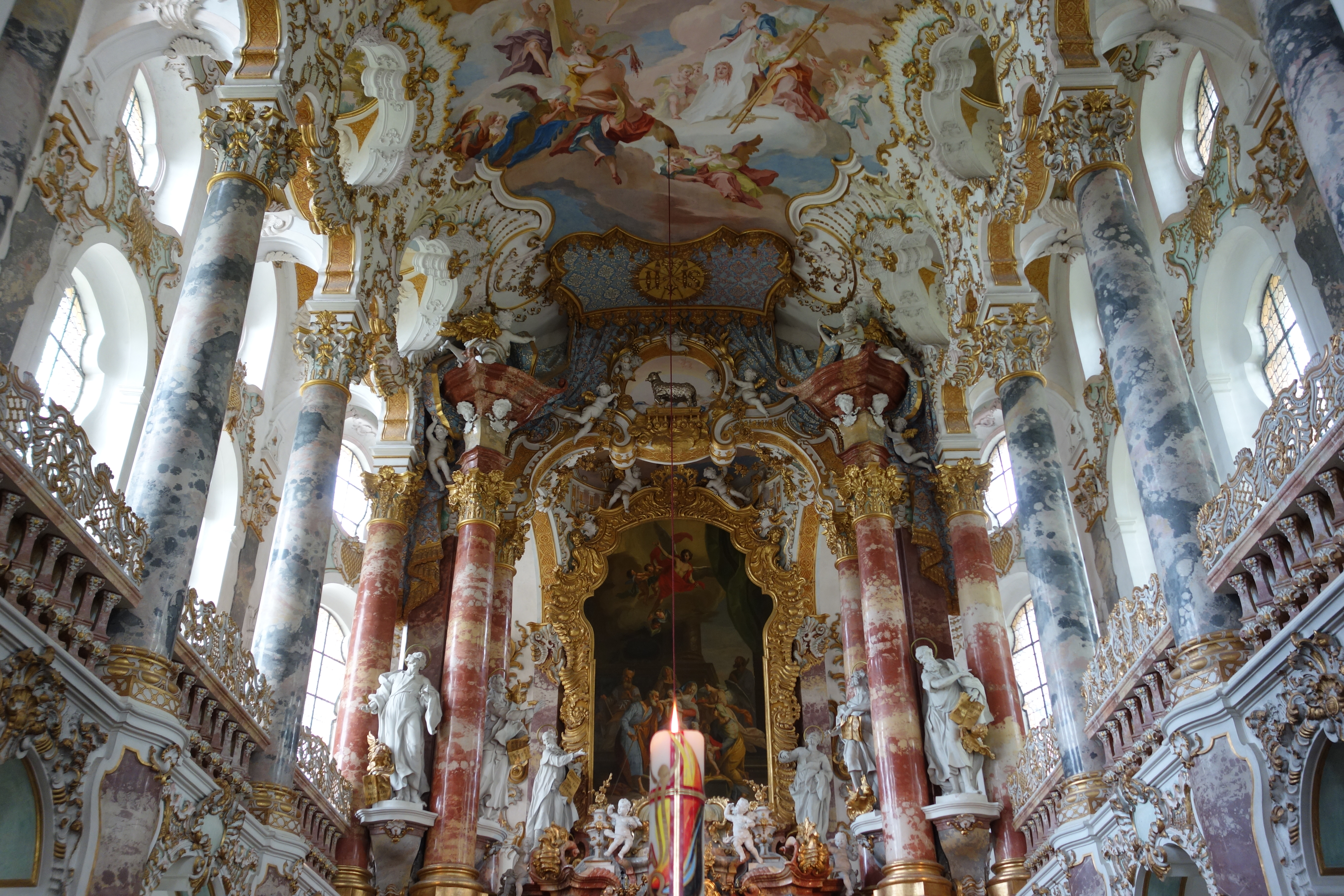
Pilgrimage Church of Wies, Steingaden, Germany, by Dominikus and Johann Baptist Zimmermann, 1754

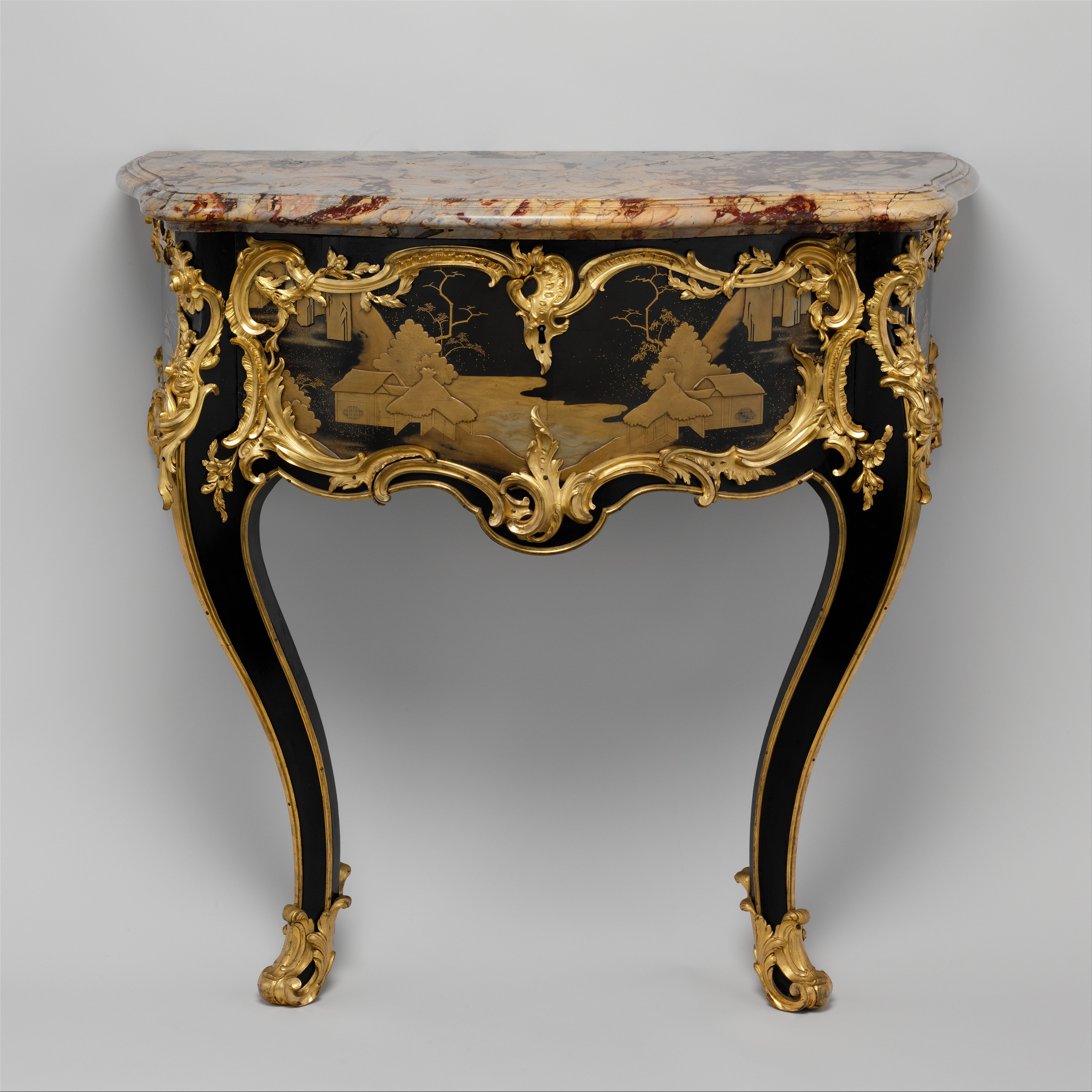
Side table (commode en console); by Bernard II van Risamburgh; c.1755-1760; Japanese lacquer, gilt-bronze mounts and Sarrancolin marble top; height: 90.2 cm; Metropolitan Museum of Art

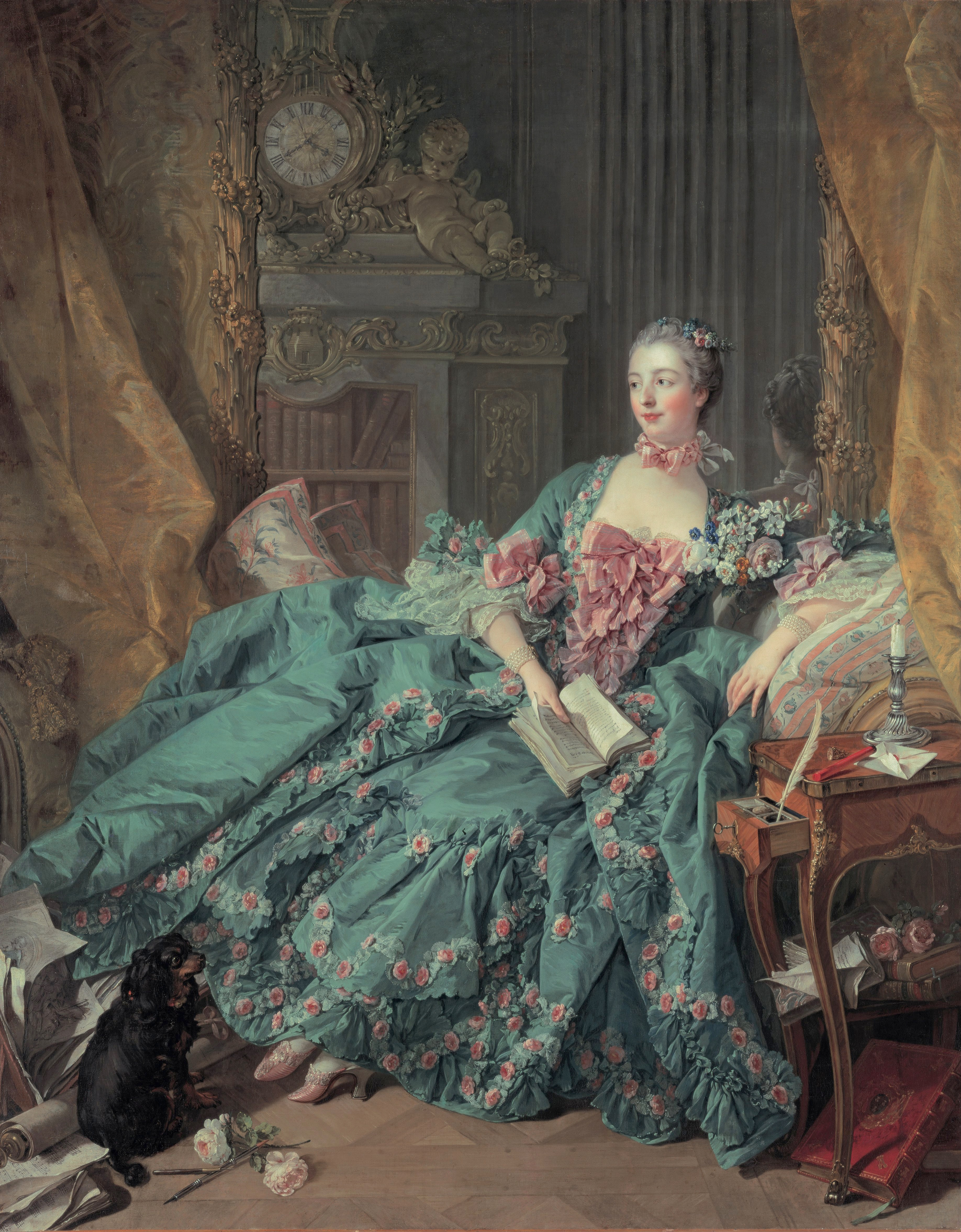
Madame de Pompadour; by François Boucher; 1756; oil on canvas; 2.01 x 1.57 m; Alte Pinakothek (Munich, Germany)

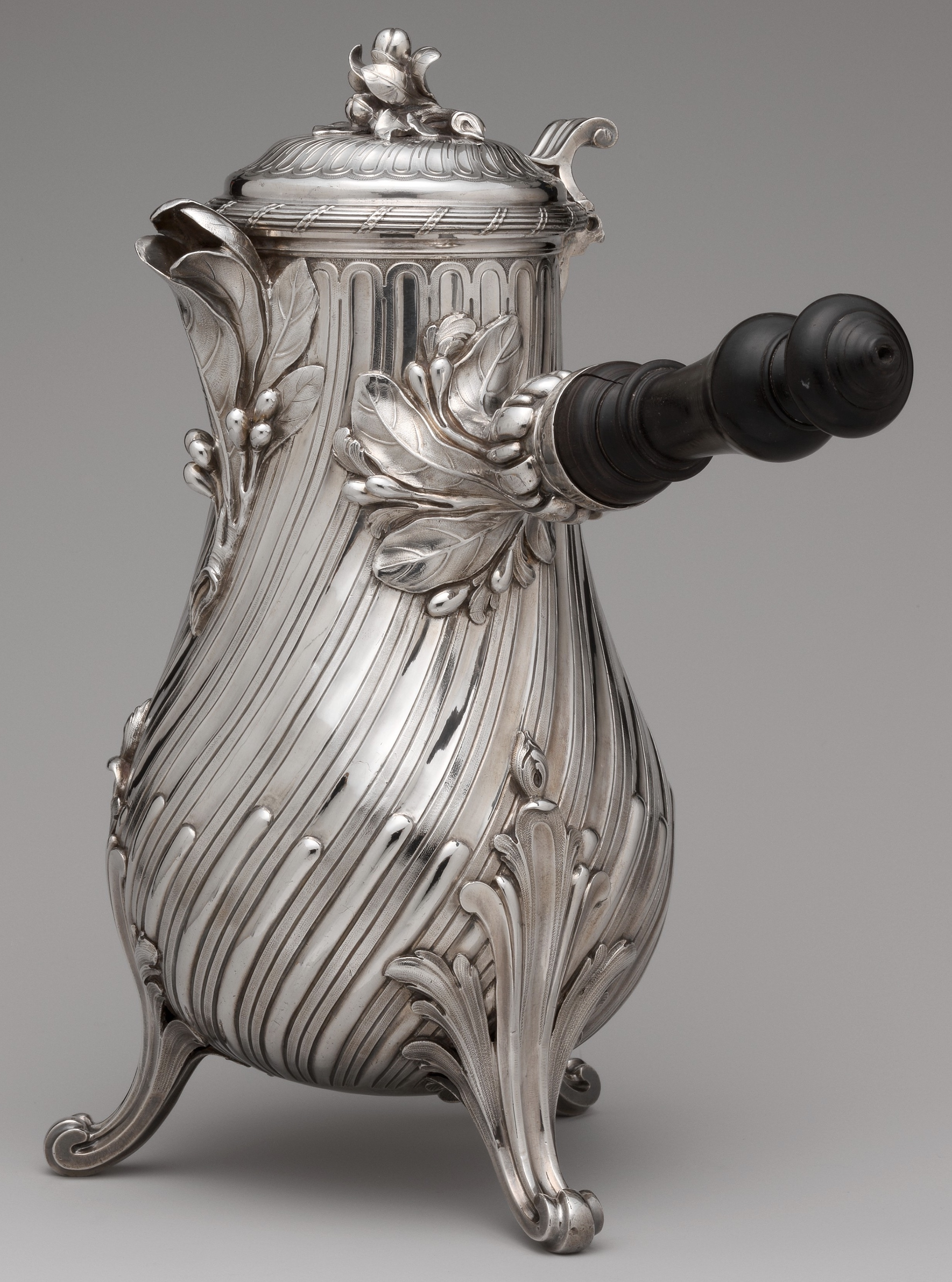
Coffeepot; 1757; silver; height: 29.5 cm; Metropolitan Museum of Art

Covered tureen (terrine du roi); by the Manufacture nationale de Sèvres 1756; soft-paste porcelain with enamel and gilt decoration; overall: 24.2 cm; Cleveland Museum of Art

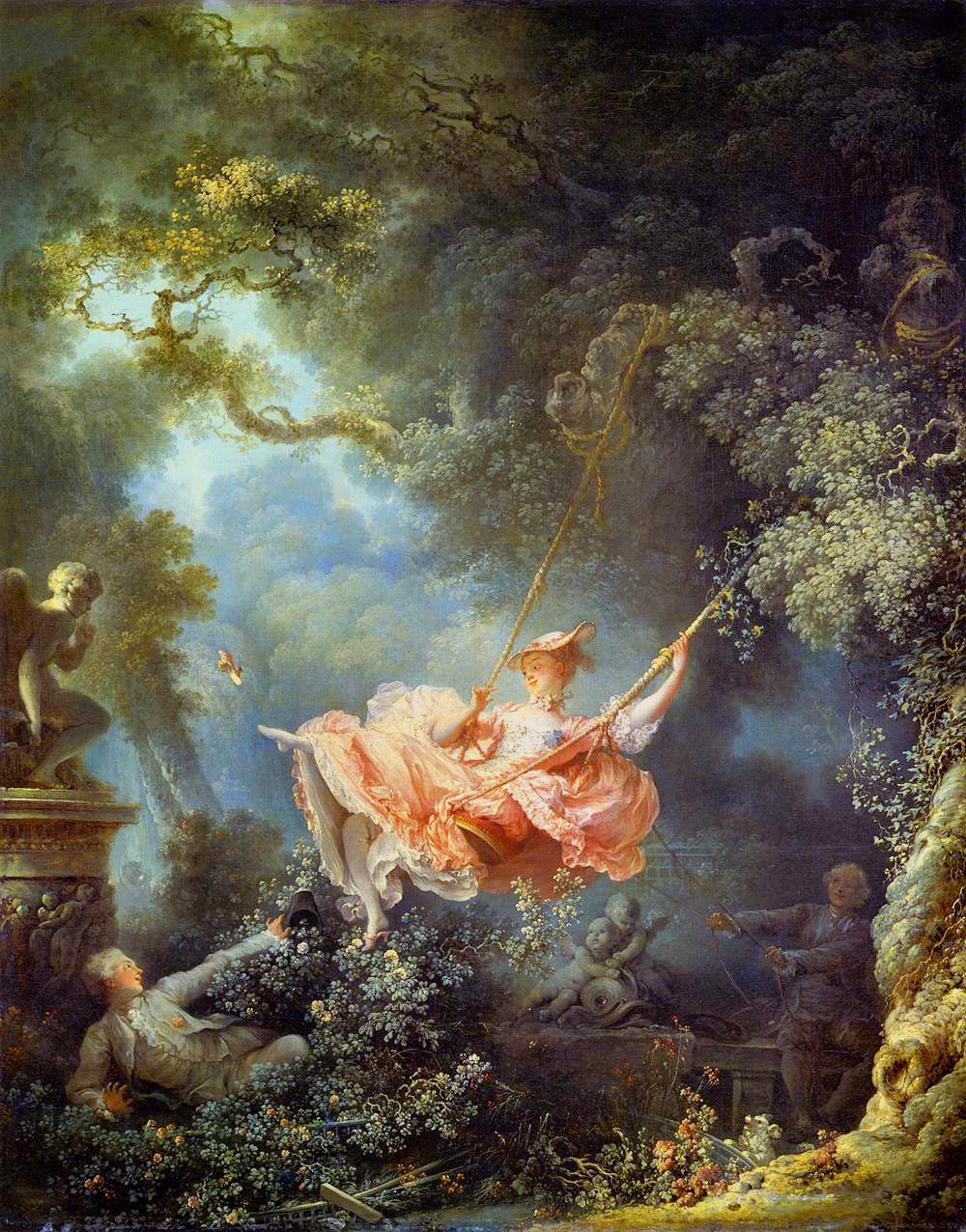
The Swing; by Jean-Honoré Fragonard; 1767; oil on canvas; 81 x 64 cm; Wallace Collection (London)

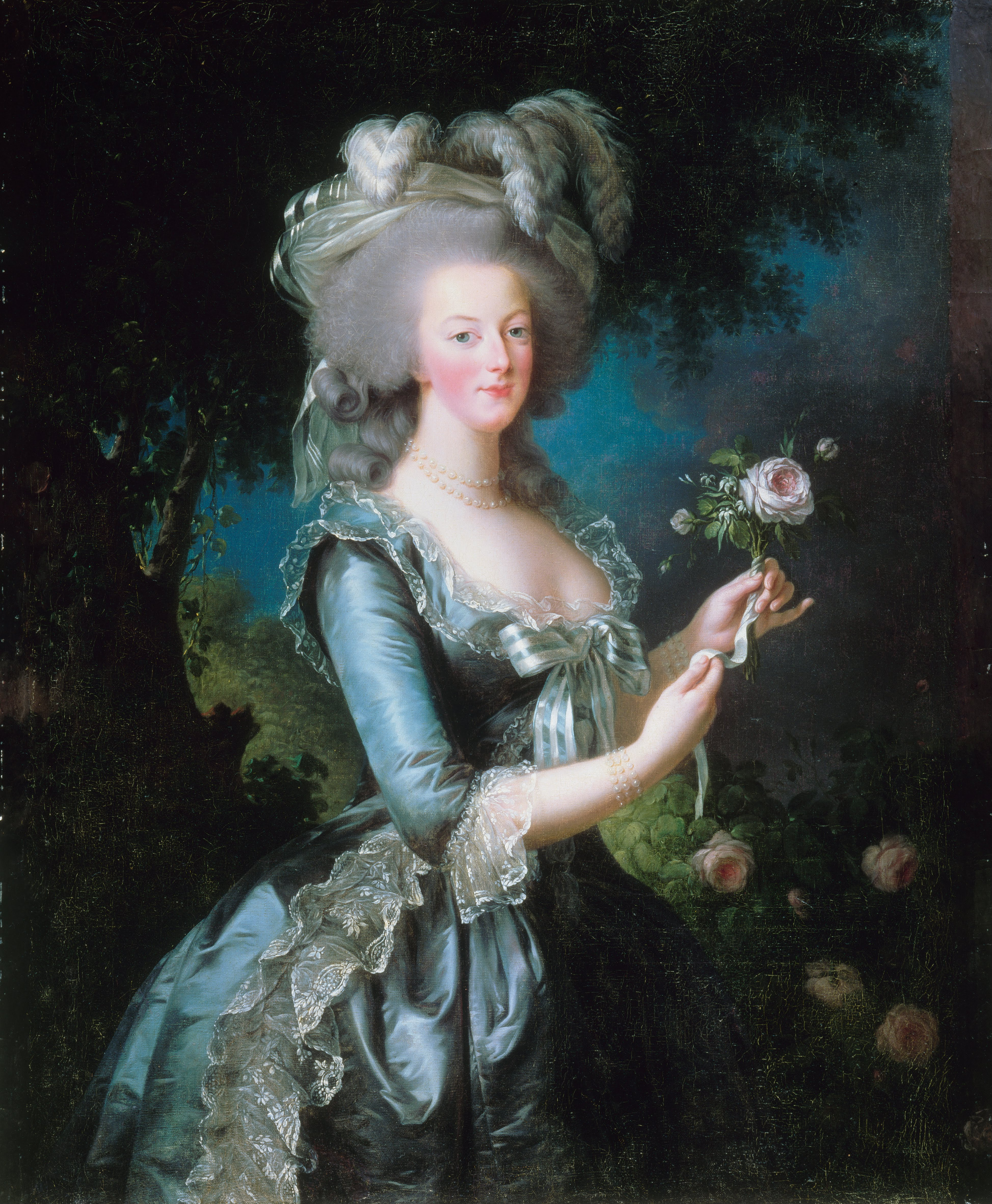
Marie-Antoinette with the Rose; by Élisabeth Vigée Le Brun; 1783; oil on canvas; 130 x 87 cm; Palace of Versailles (Versailles, France)

=== Neoclassicism ===
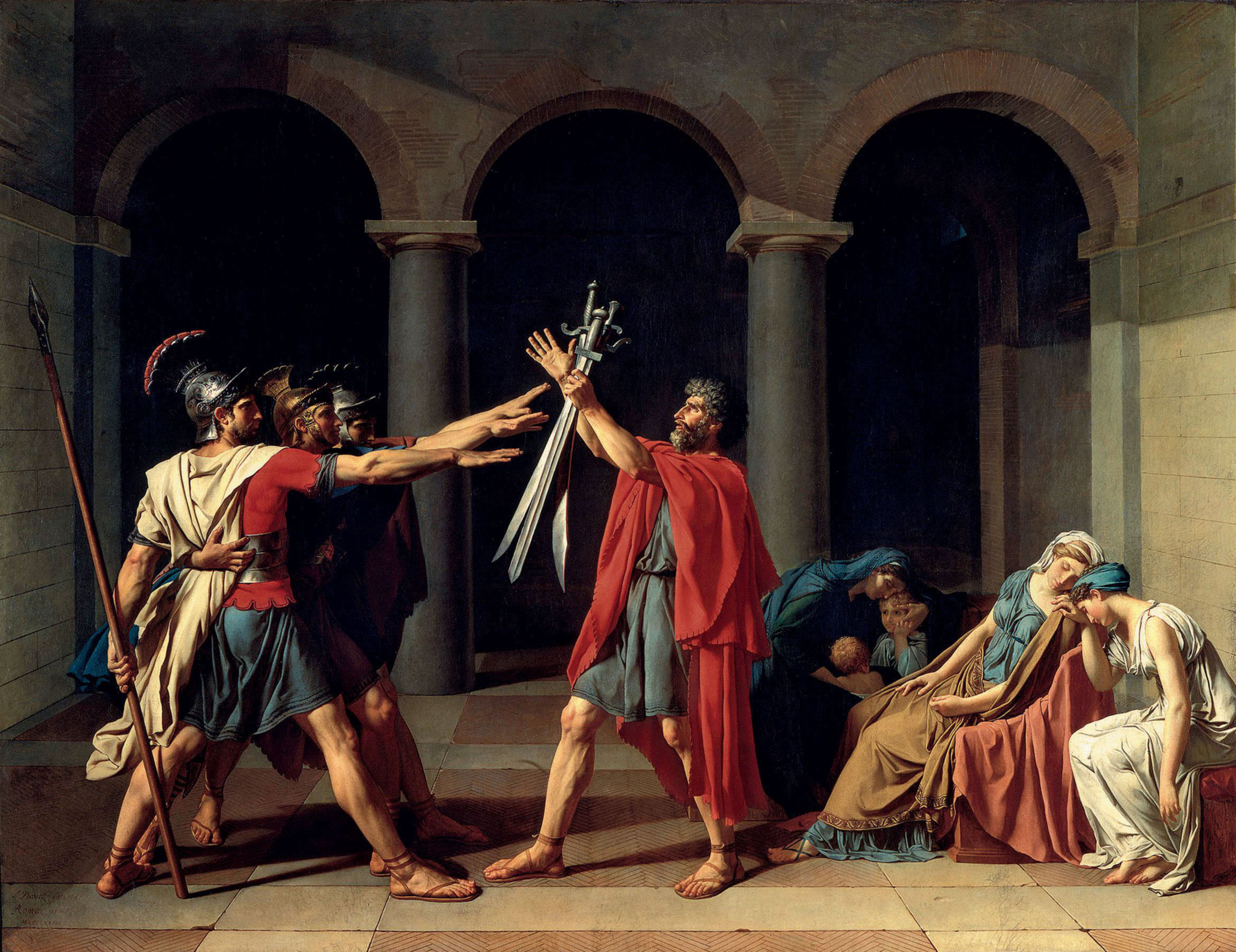
Oath of the Horatii, by Jacques-Louis David, 1784, oil on canvas, Louvre

Inspired by the excavations of the ancient Roman cities of Pompeii and Herculaneum from 1748, a renewed interest in the arts of antiquity occurred. Neoclassicism dominates Western art from the mid to late 18th century until the 1830s. Embracing order and restraint, it developed in reaction to the perceived frivolity, hedonism and decadence of Rococo and exemplifying the rational thinking of the 'Age of Enlightenment' (aka the 'Age of Reason'). Initially, the movement was developed not by artists, but by Enlightenment philosophers. They requested replacing Rococo with a style of rational art, moral and dedicated to the soul. This fit well with a perception of Classical art as the embodiment of realism, restraint and order. Inspired by ancient Greek and Roman art, the classical history paintings of the French artist Nicolas Poussin (1594–1665) and the ideas of the German writer Anton Raphael Mengs (1728–1779) and the German archaeologist and art historian Johann Joachim Winckelmann (1717–1768), Neoclassicism began in Rome, but soon spread throughout Europe. Rome had become the main focus of the Grand Tour by the mid-18th century, and aristocratic travellers went there in search of Classical visions to recreate on their country estates, thus spreading the style across Europe, particularly in England and France. The tour was also an opportunity for collecting Classical antiquities. Neoclassical paintings tended to be populated with figures posed like Classical statues or reliefs, set in locations filled with archaeological details. The style favoured Greek art over Roman, considering it purer and more authentically classical in its aesthetic goal.

In 1789, France was on the brink of its first revolution and Neoclassicism sought to express their patriotic feelings. Politics and art were closely entwined during this period. They believed that art should be serious, and valued drawings above painting; smooth contours and paint with no discernible brushstrokes were the ultimate aim. Both painting and sculpture exerted calmness and restraint and focused on heroic themes, expressing such noble notions as self-sacrifice and nationalism.

This movement paved the way for Romanticism, that appeared when the idealism of the revolution faded away and after the Napoleonic period came to an end in the early 19th century. Neoclassicism should not be seen as the opposite of Romanticism, however, but in some ways an early manifestation of it.

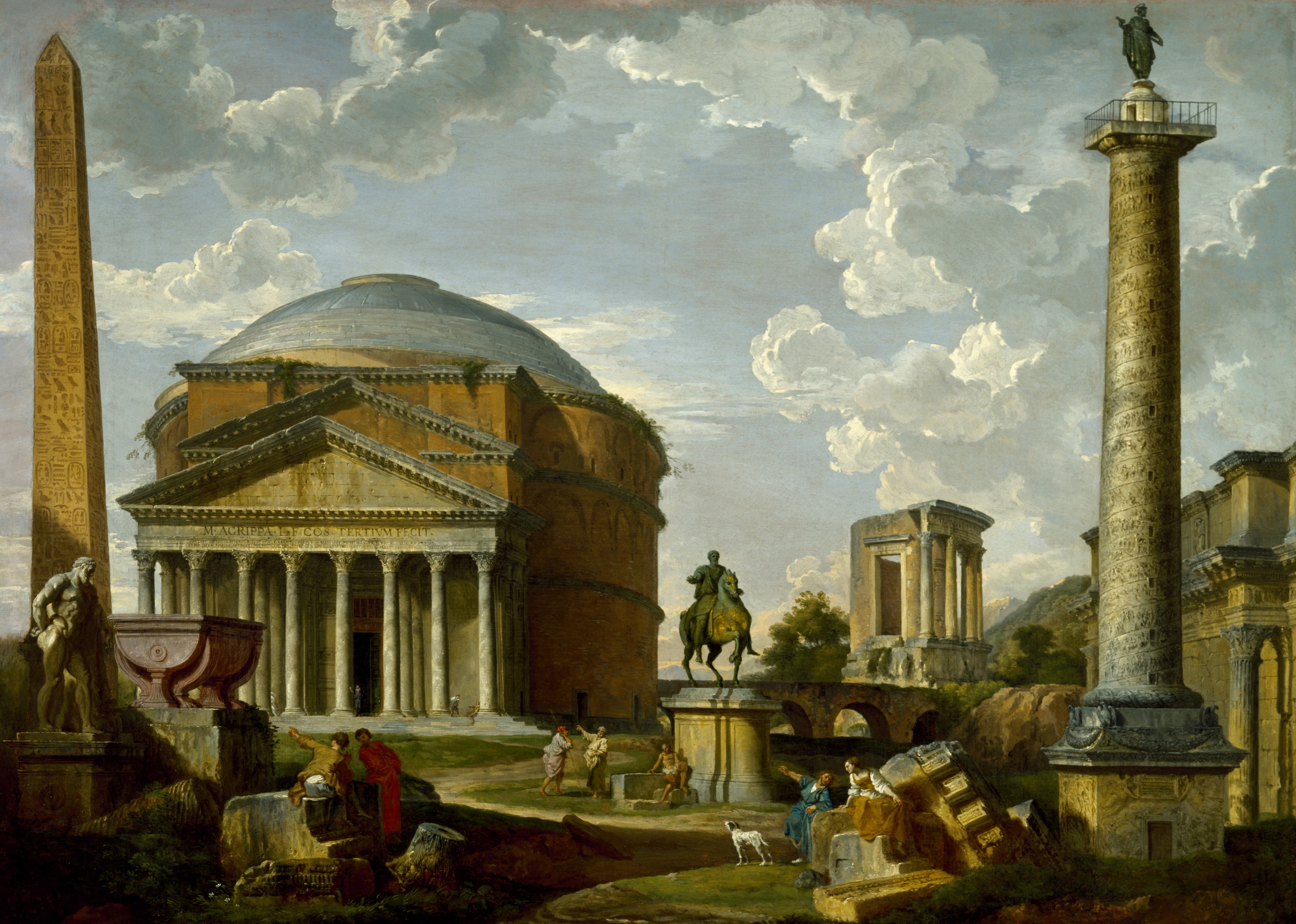
Fantasy View with the Pantheon and other Monuments of Ancient Rome, by Giovanni Paolo Panini, 1737, oil on canvas, Museum of Fine Arts, Houston, US

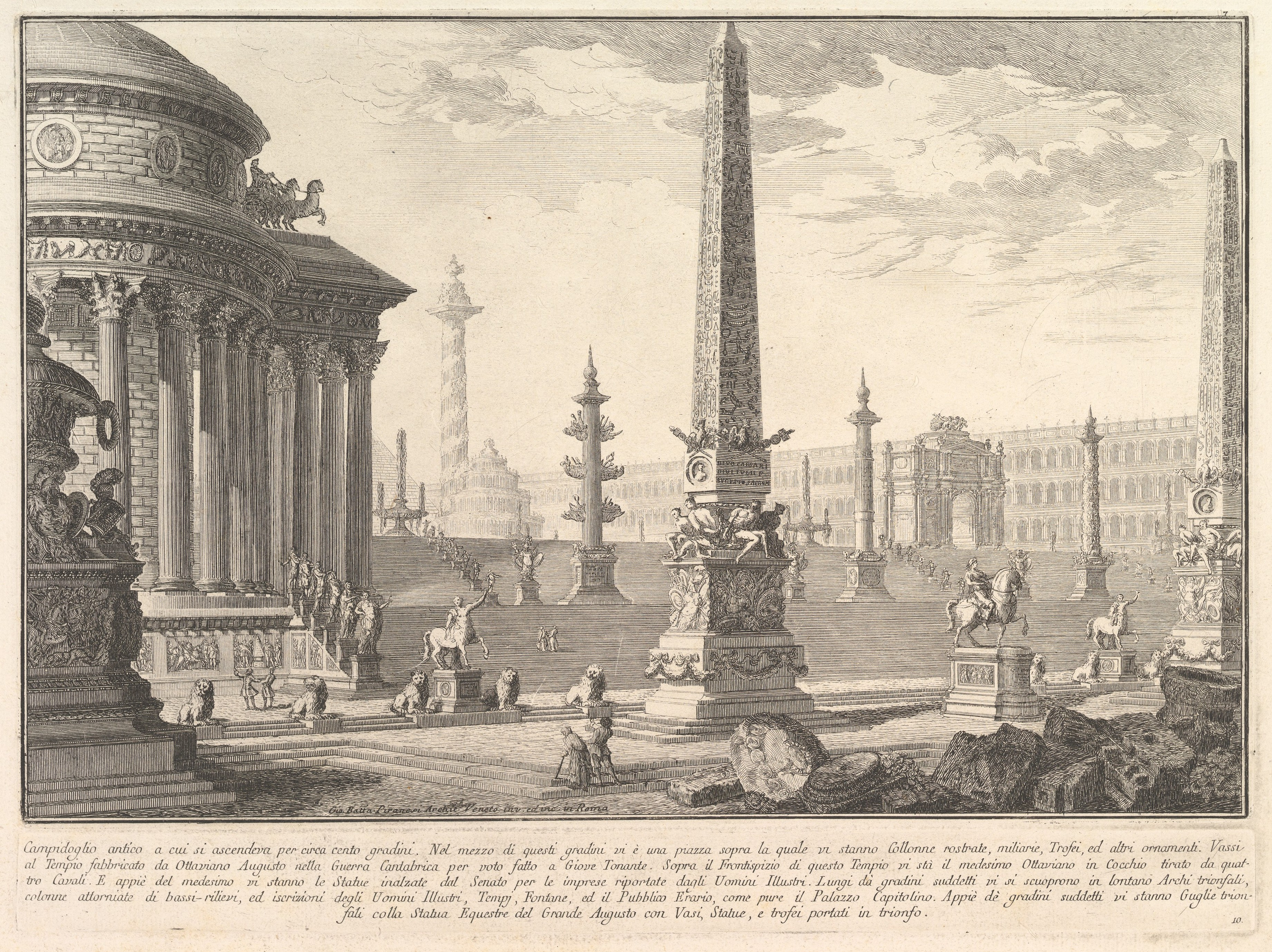
The ancient Capitol ascended by approximately one hundred steps . . ., by Giovanni Battista Piranesi, c.1750, etching, Metropolitan Museum of Art, New York City

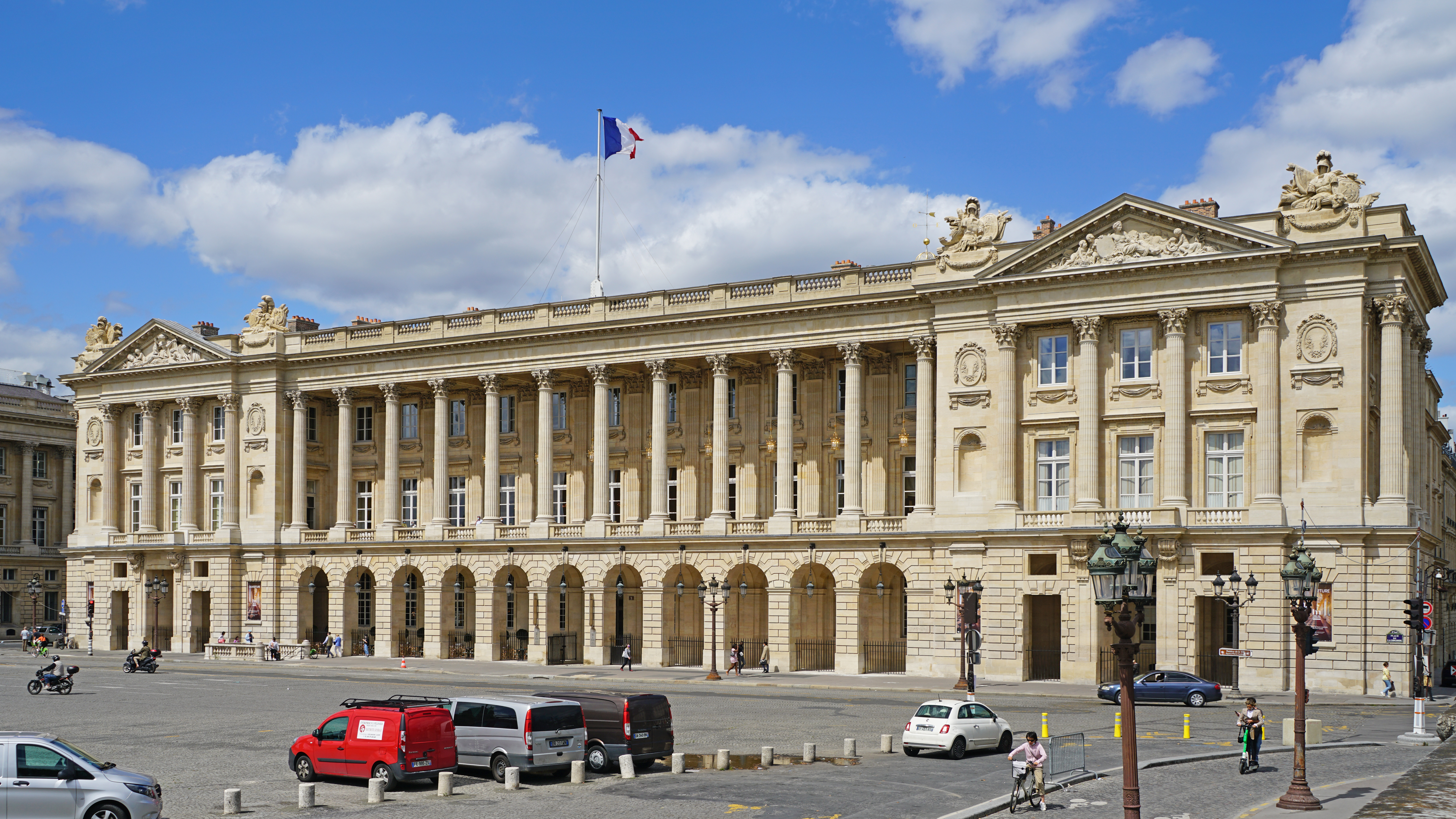
Hôtel de la Marine, Paris, by Ange-Jacques Gabriel, 1761–1770

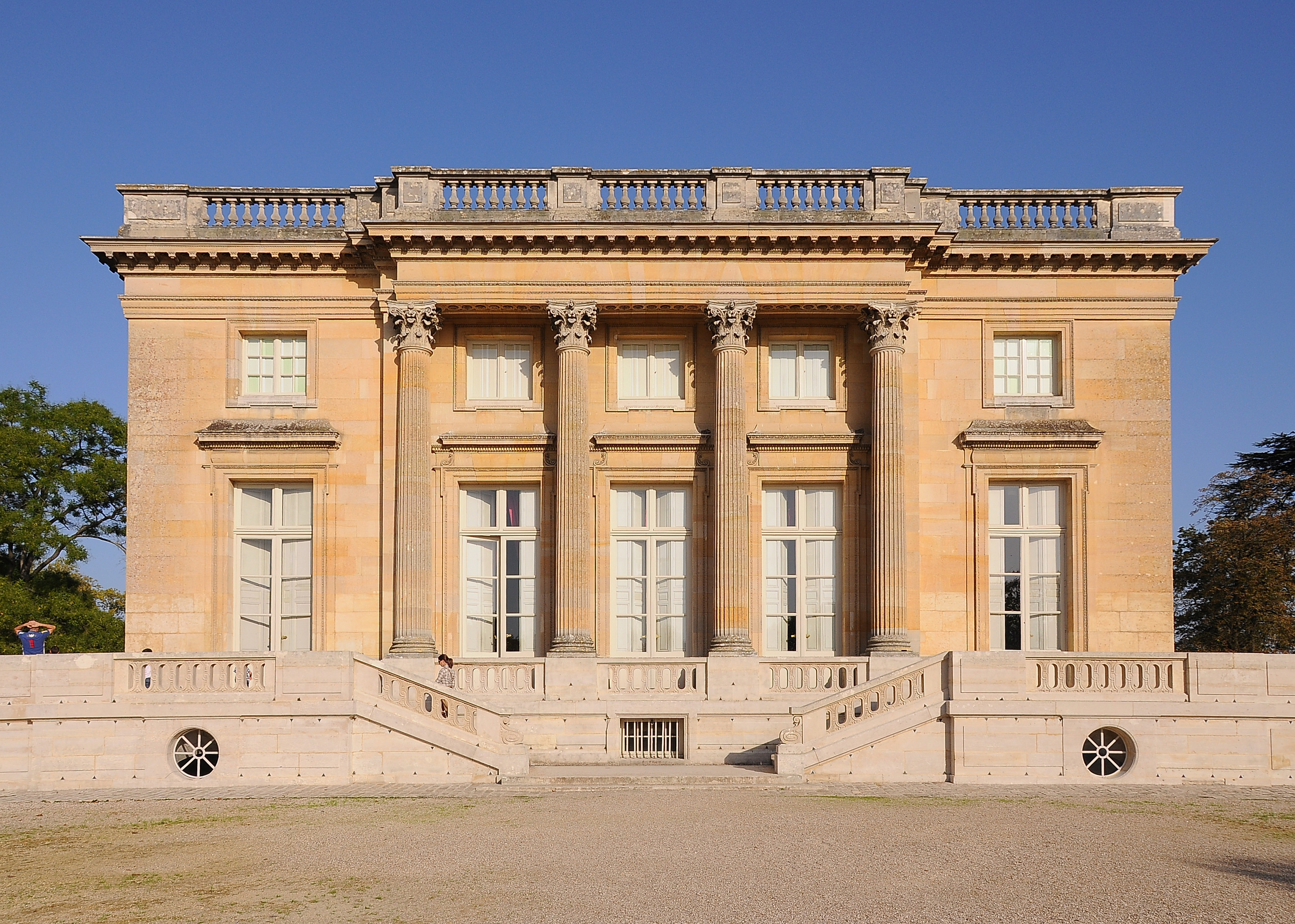
Petit Trianon, Versailles, France, by Ange-Jacques Gabriel, 1764

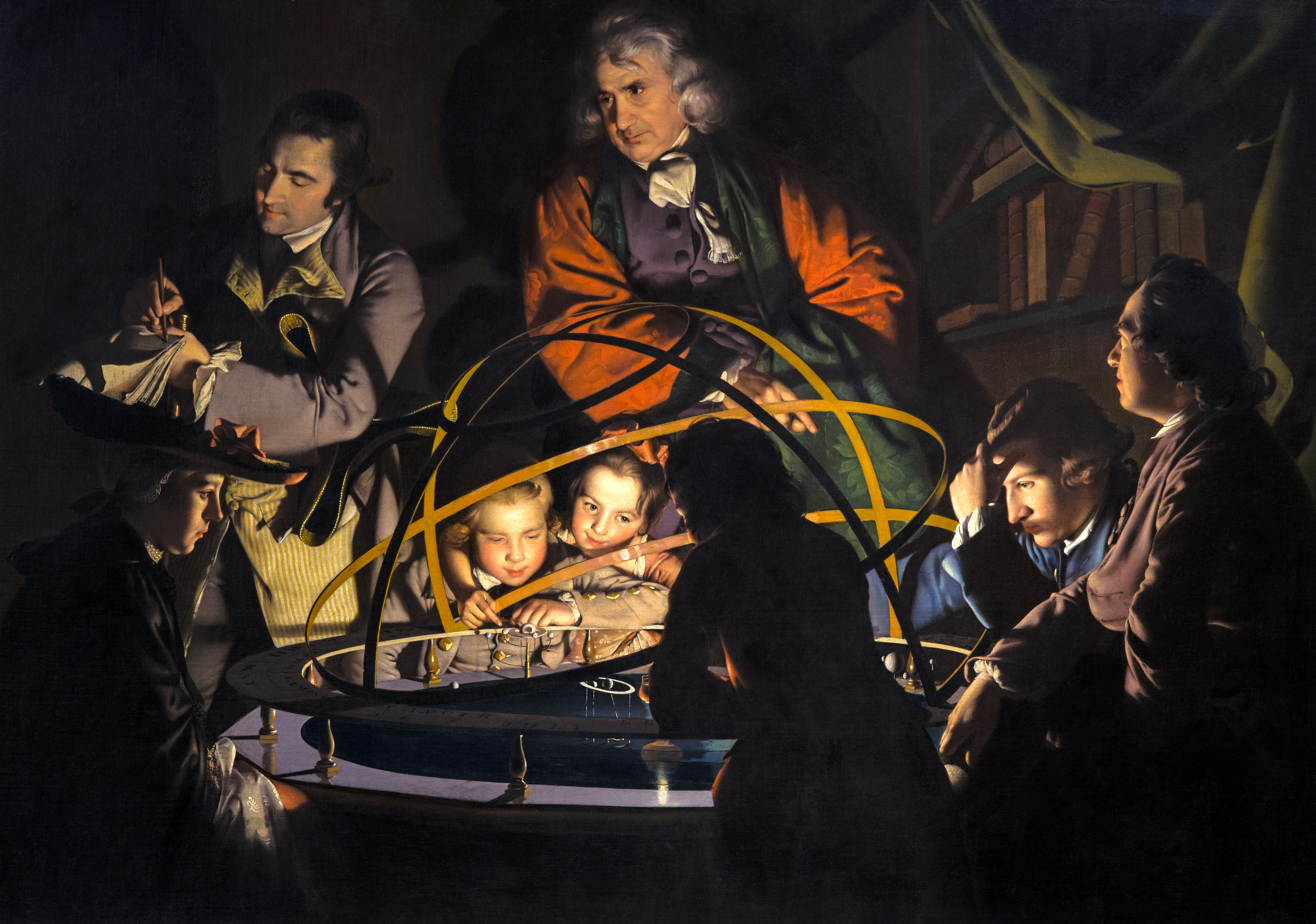
A Philosopher Lecturing on the Orrery, by Joseph Wright of Derby, c.1766, oil on canvas, Derby Museum and Art Gallery, Derby, England

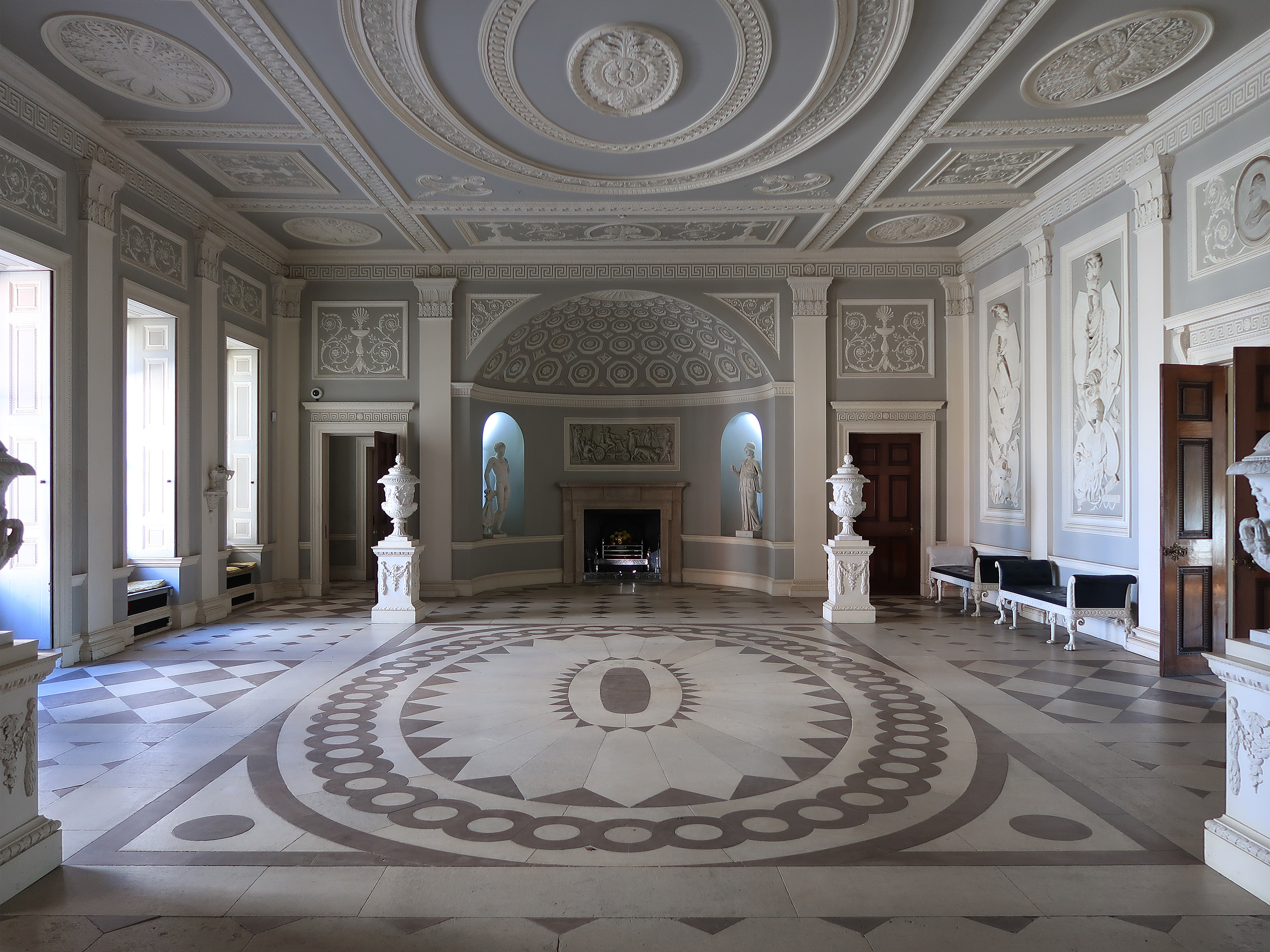
The Hall, Osterley Park, London, by Robert Adam, 1767

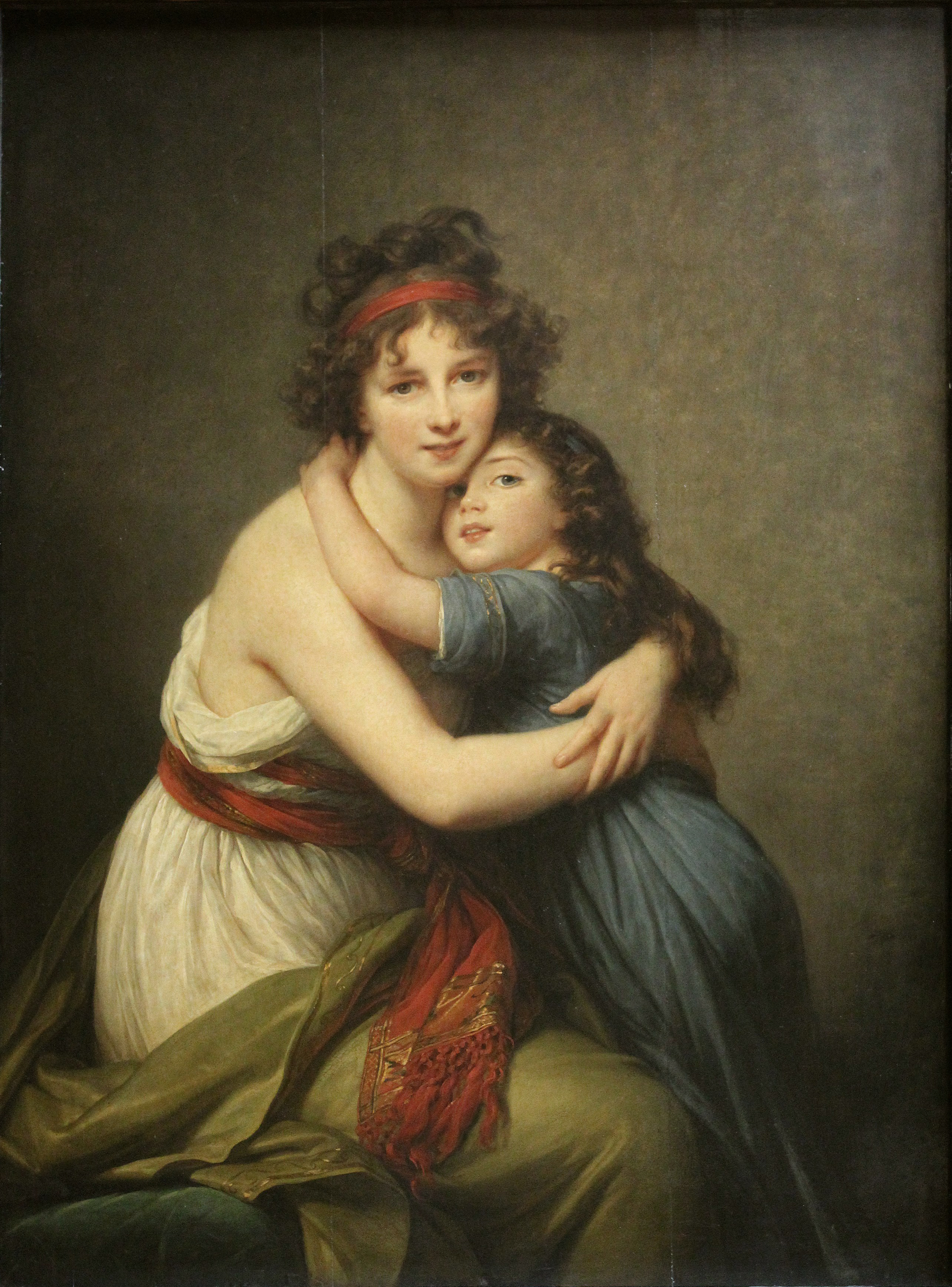
The Artist and her Daughter, by Élisabeth Vigée Le Brun, c.1785, oil on canvas, Louvre

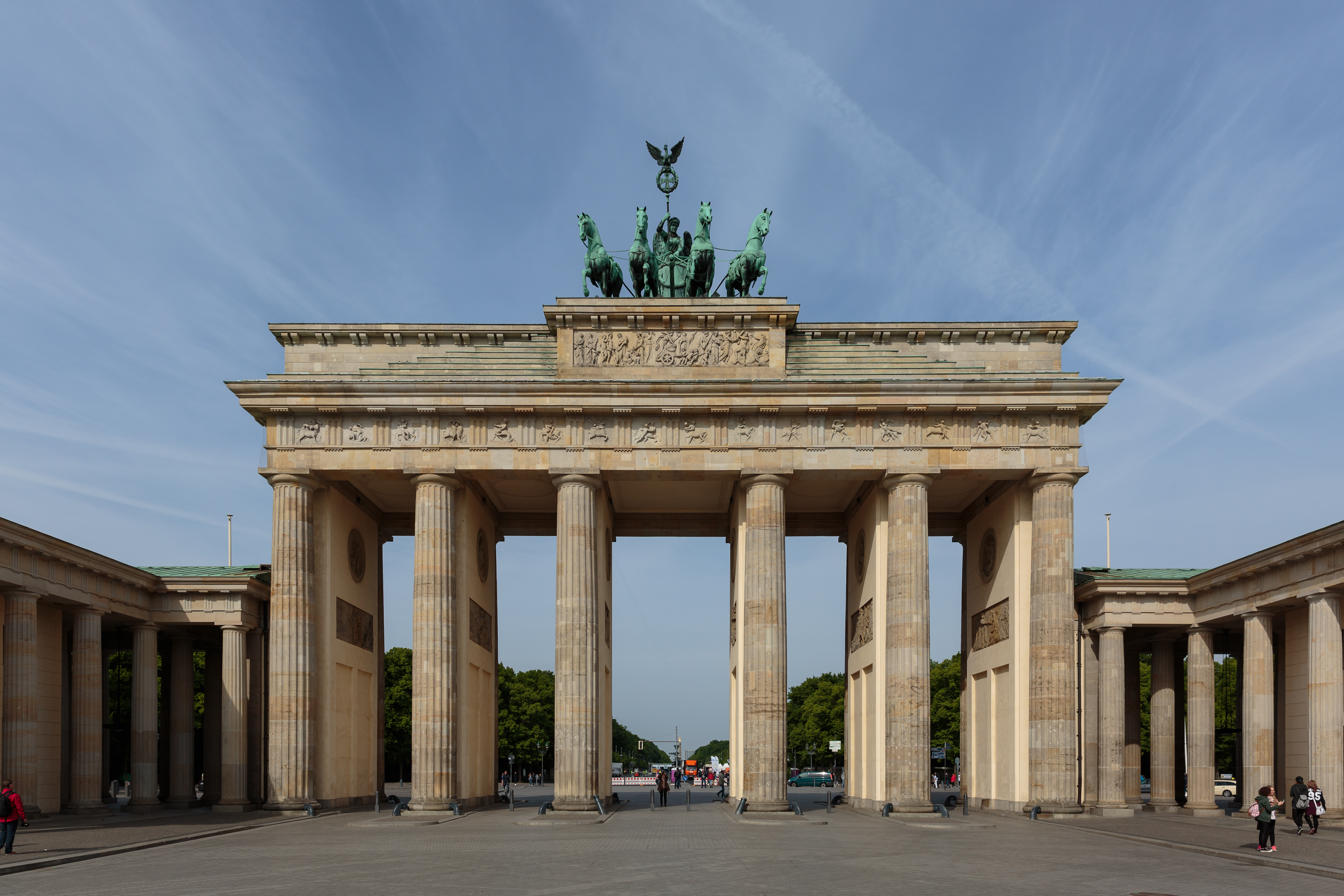
Brandenburg Gate in Berlin (1788–1791) by Carl Gotthard Langhans

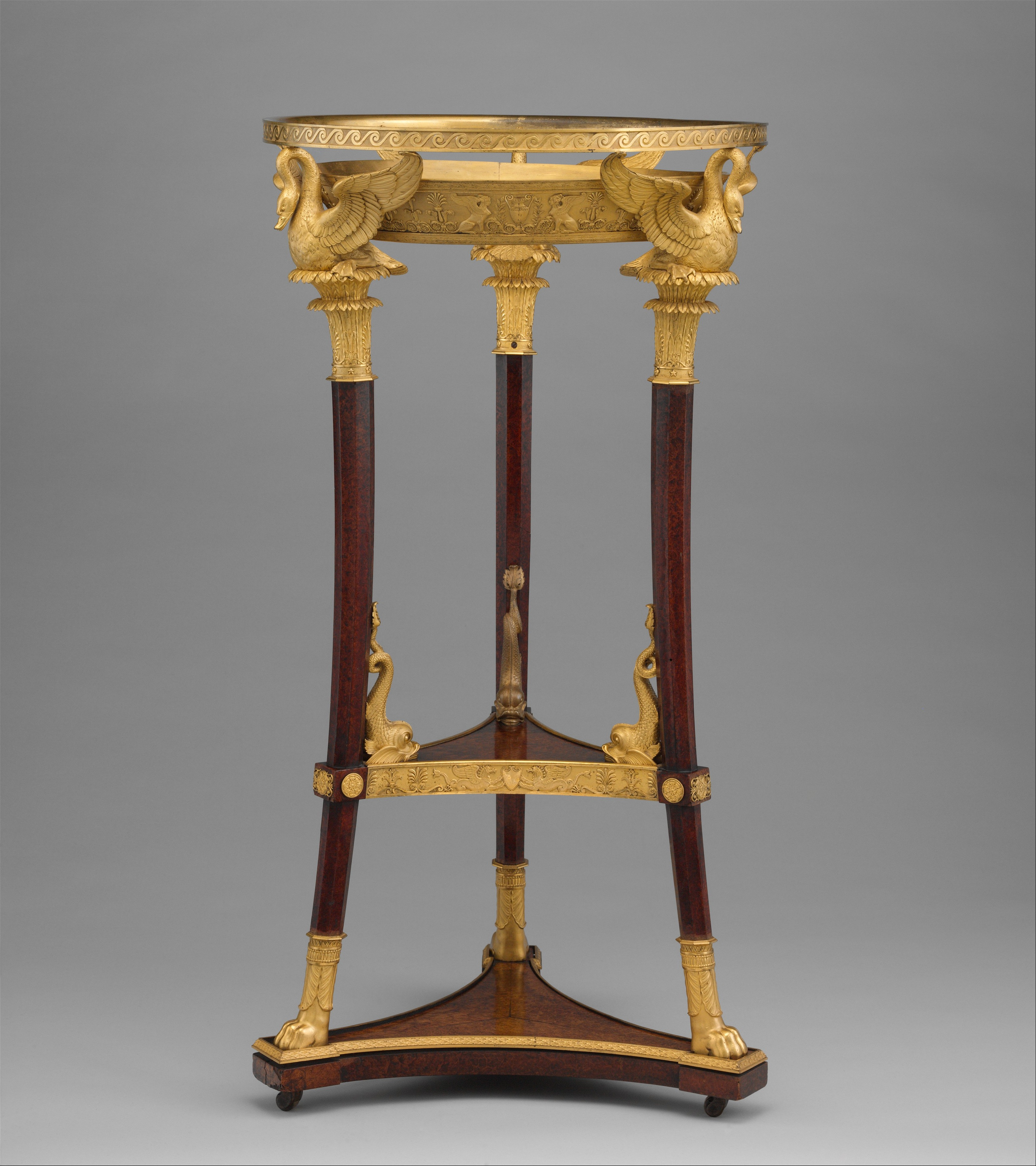
Washstand (athénienne or lavabo), 1800–1814, legs, base and shelf of yew wood, gilt-bronze mounts, iron plate beneath shelf, Metropolitan Museum of Art

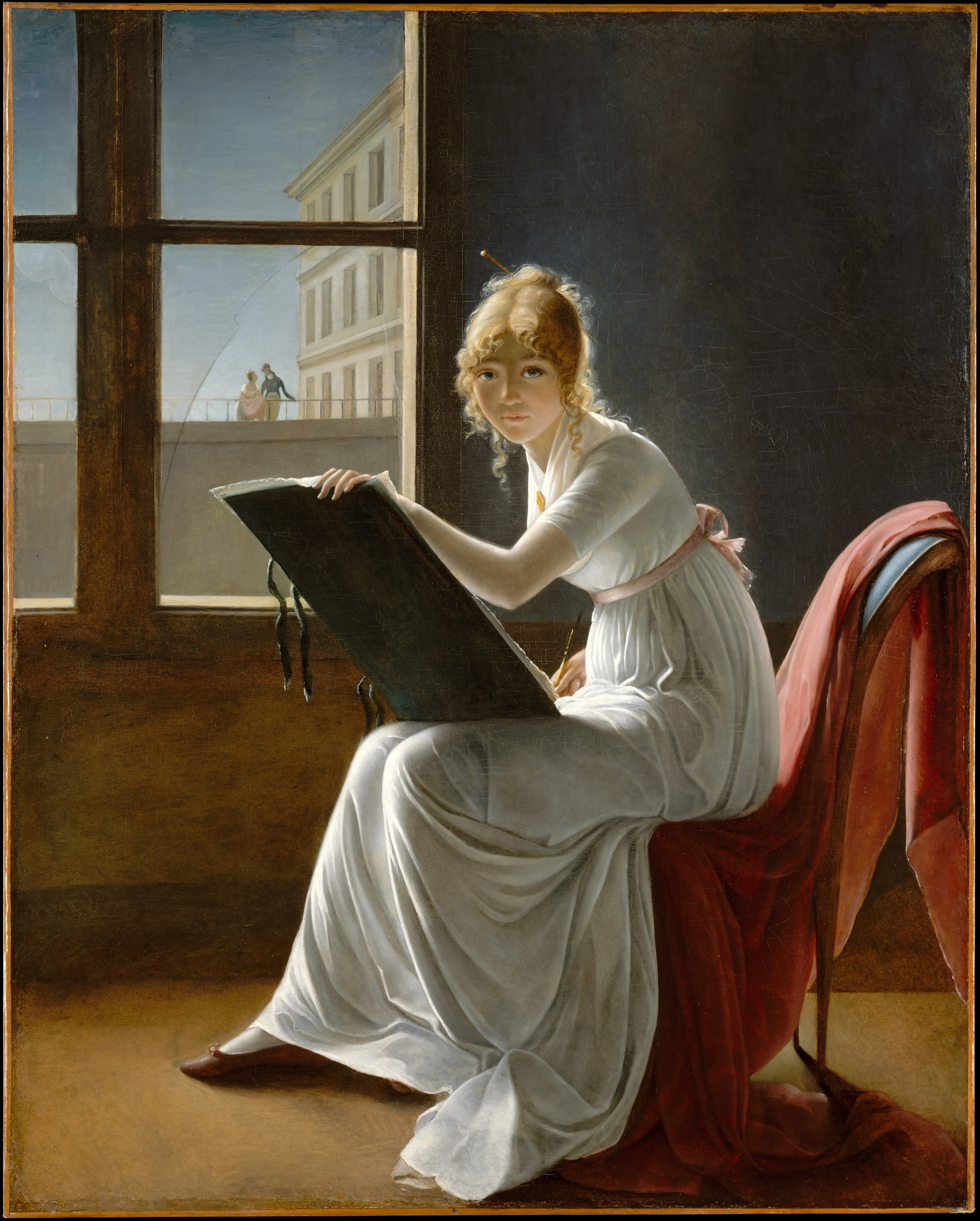
Portrait of Charlotte du Val d'Ognes, by Marie-Denise Villers, 1801, oil on canvas, Metropolitan Museum of Art

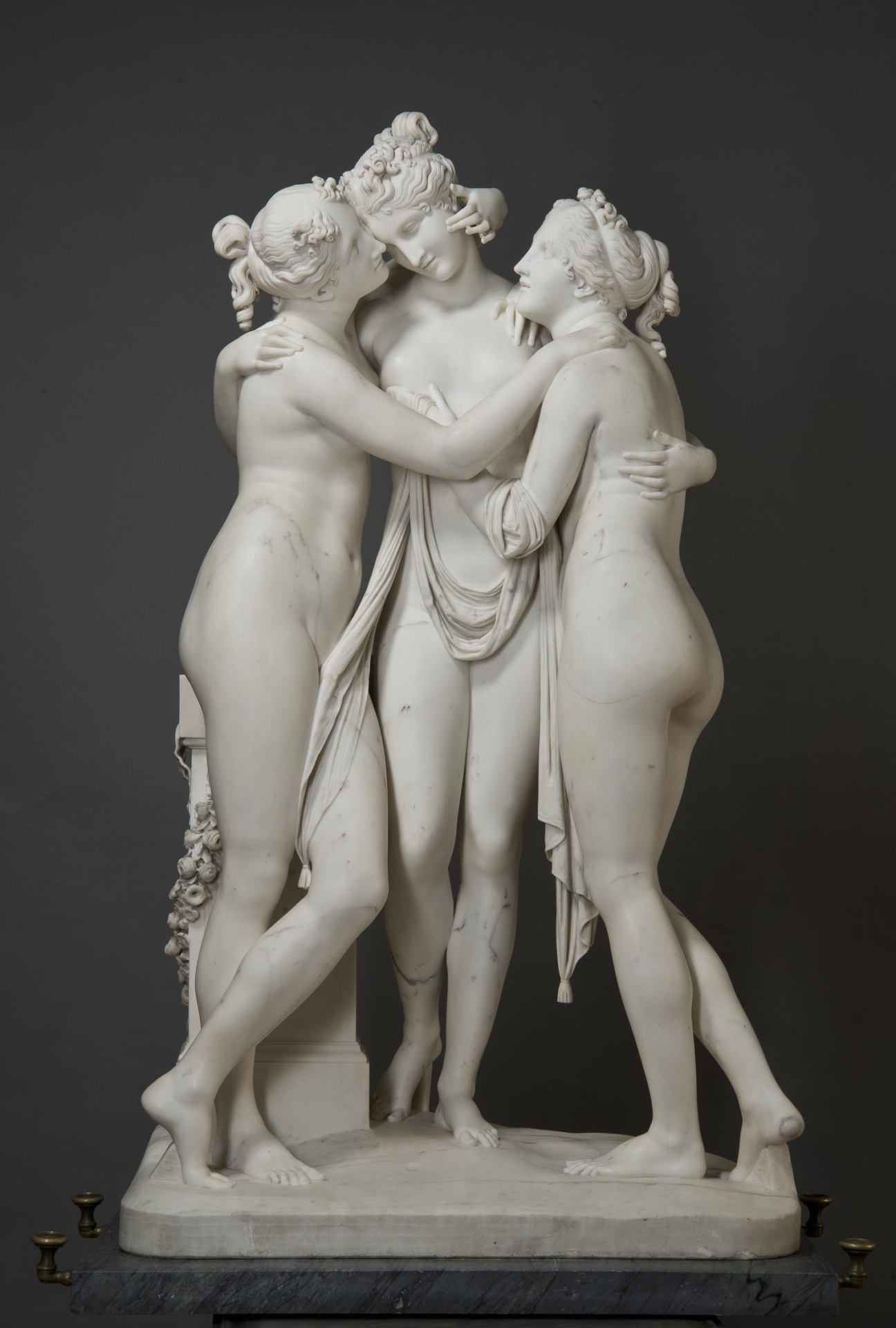
The Three Graces, by Antonio Canova, 1813–1816, marble, Hermitage Museum, Saint Petersburg, Russia

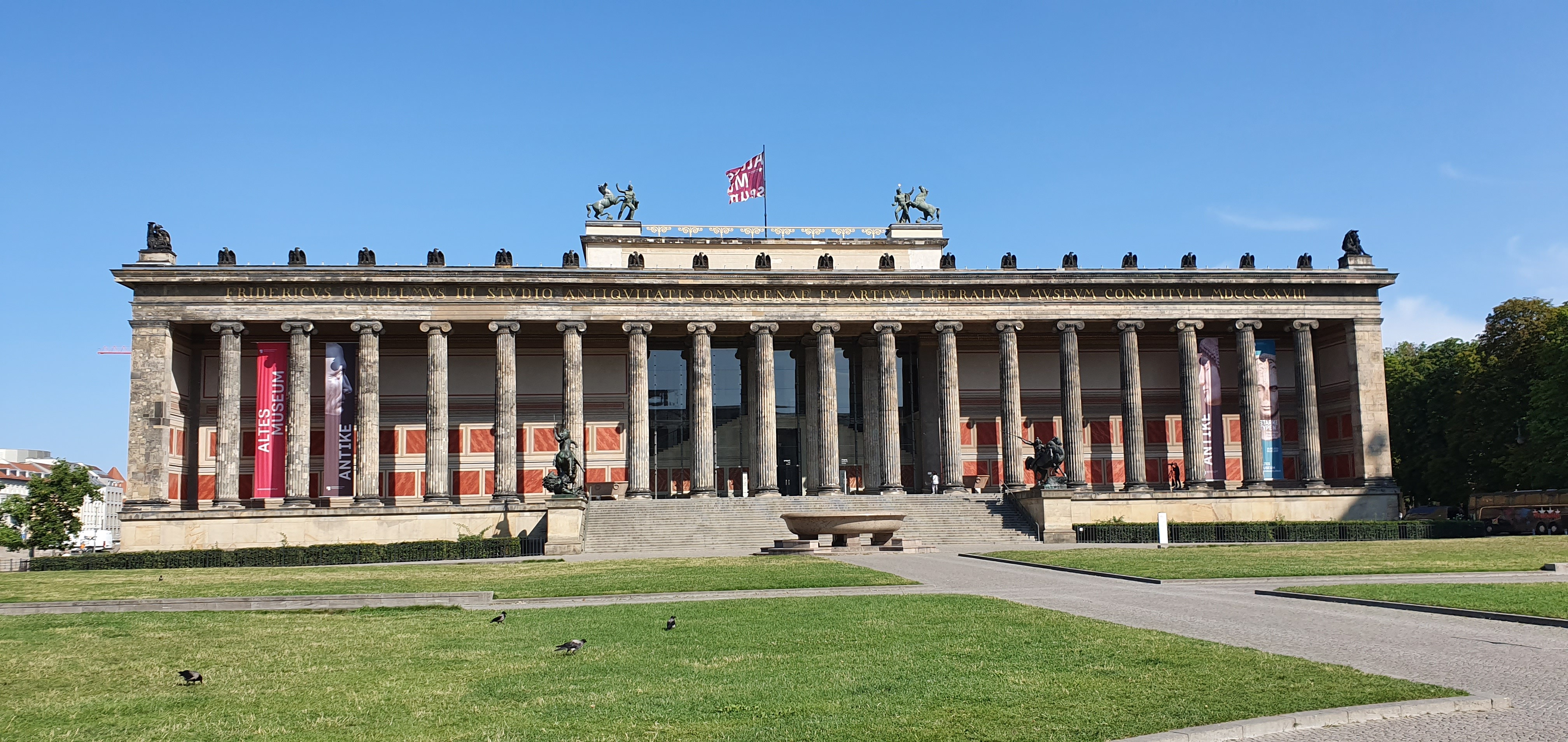
Altes Museum in Berlin (1825–1830) by Karl Friedrich Schinkel

== Western art after 1770 ==
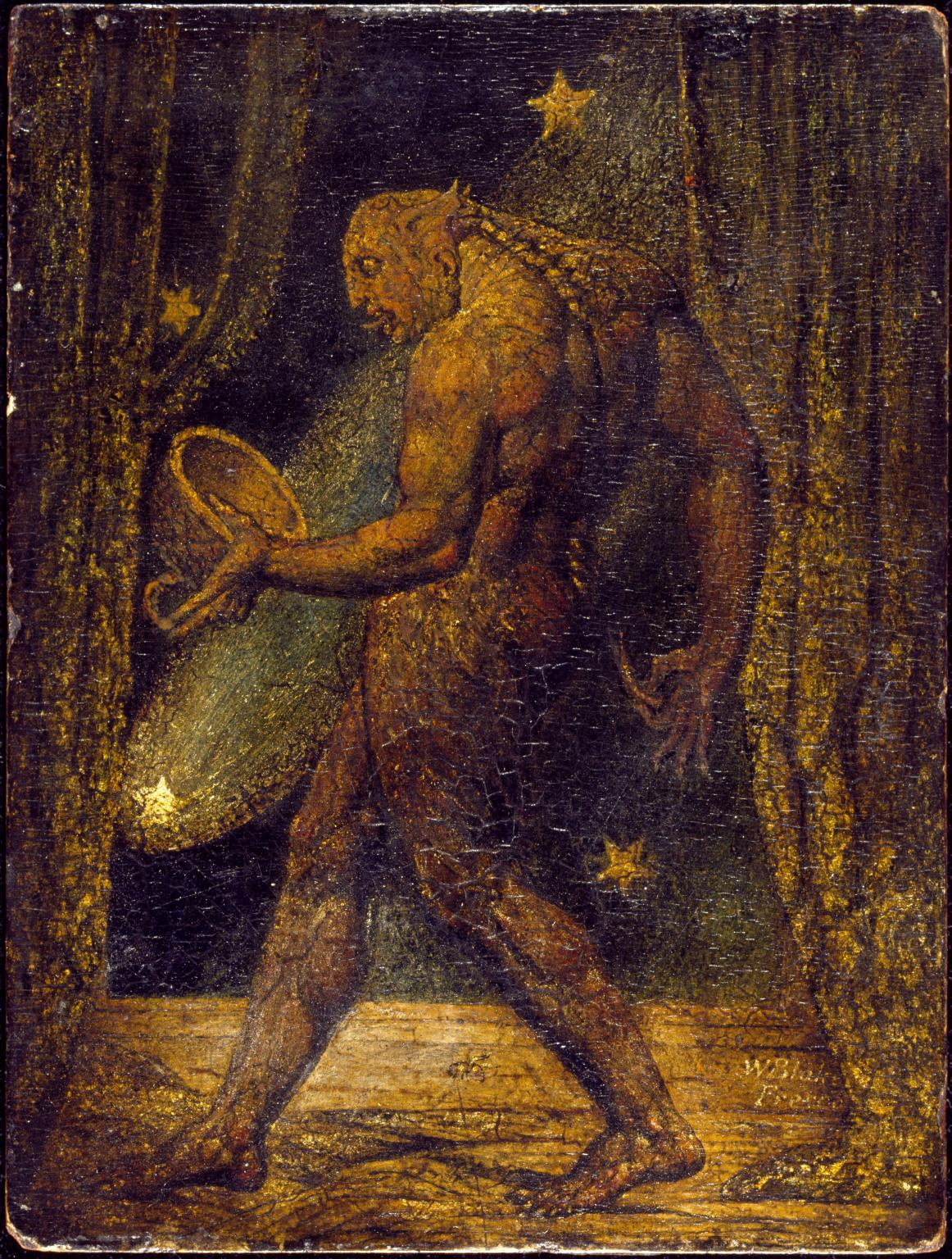
The Ghost of a Flea; by William Blake; 1819; tempera with gold on panel; Tate Britain, London

Many art historians place the origins of modern art in the late 18th century, others in the mid 19th century. Art historian H. Harvard Arnason stated "a gradual metamorphosis took place in the course of a hundred years." Events such as the Age of Enlightenment, revolutions and democracies in America and France, and the Industrial Revolution had far reaching affects in western culture. People, commodities, ideas, and information could travel between countries and continents with unprecedented speed and these changes were reflected in the arts. The invention of photography in the 1830s further altered certain aspects of art, particularly painting. By the dawn of the 19th century, a long and gradual paradigm shift was complete, from the Gothic when artists were viewed as craftsmen in the service of the church and monarchies, to the idea of art for art's sake, where the ideas and visions of the individual artist were held in the high regard, with patronage from an increasingly literate, affluent, and urban middle and upper class population that had been emerging for 200 years (particularly in Paris and London). A dichotomy began in the late 18th century between neoclassicism and romanticism that subdivided and continued to run through virtually every new movement in modern art: "Spreading like waves, these "isms" defy national, ethnic, and chronological boundaries; never dominant anywhere for long, they compete or merge with each other in endlessly shifting patterns."

Modern art has consistently moved toward international influences and exchanges, from the exotic curiosity of Orientalism, the deeper influence of Japonisme, to the arts of Oceania, Africa, and the Americas. Conversely modern art has increasingly extended beyond western Europe. In Russia and the US the arts were developing to a degree that rivaled the leading European countries by the end of the 19th century. Many of the major movements appeared in Latin America, Australia, and Asia too and geography and nationality became increasingly insignificant with each passing decade. By the 20th century important and influential artists were emerging around the world: e.g. Foujita (Japan), Arshile Gorky (Armenia), Diego Rivera and Frida Kahlo (Mexico), Wifredo Lam (Cuba), Edvard Munch (Norwegian), Roberto Matta (Chilean), Mark Rothko (Lithuanian-American), Fernando Botero Angulo (Colombia), Constantin Brâncuși and Victor Brauner (Romania).

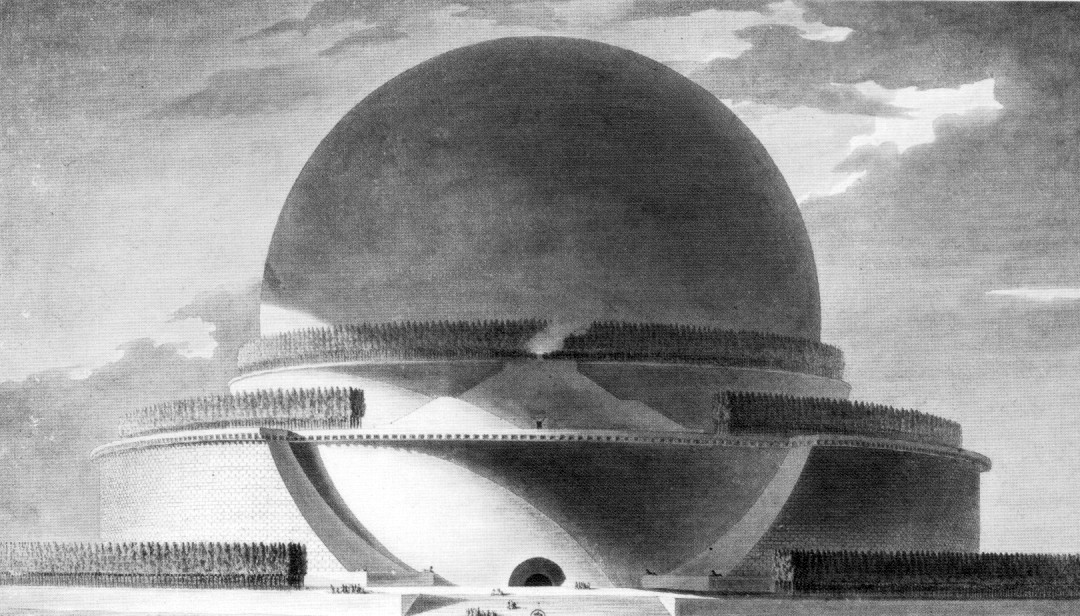
Newton's Cenotaph, exterior by night; by Étienne-Louis Boullée; 1784; ink and wash, 40.2 × 63.3 cm.; Bibliothèque Nationale

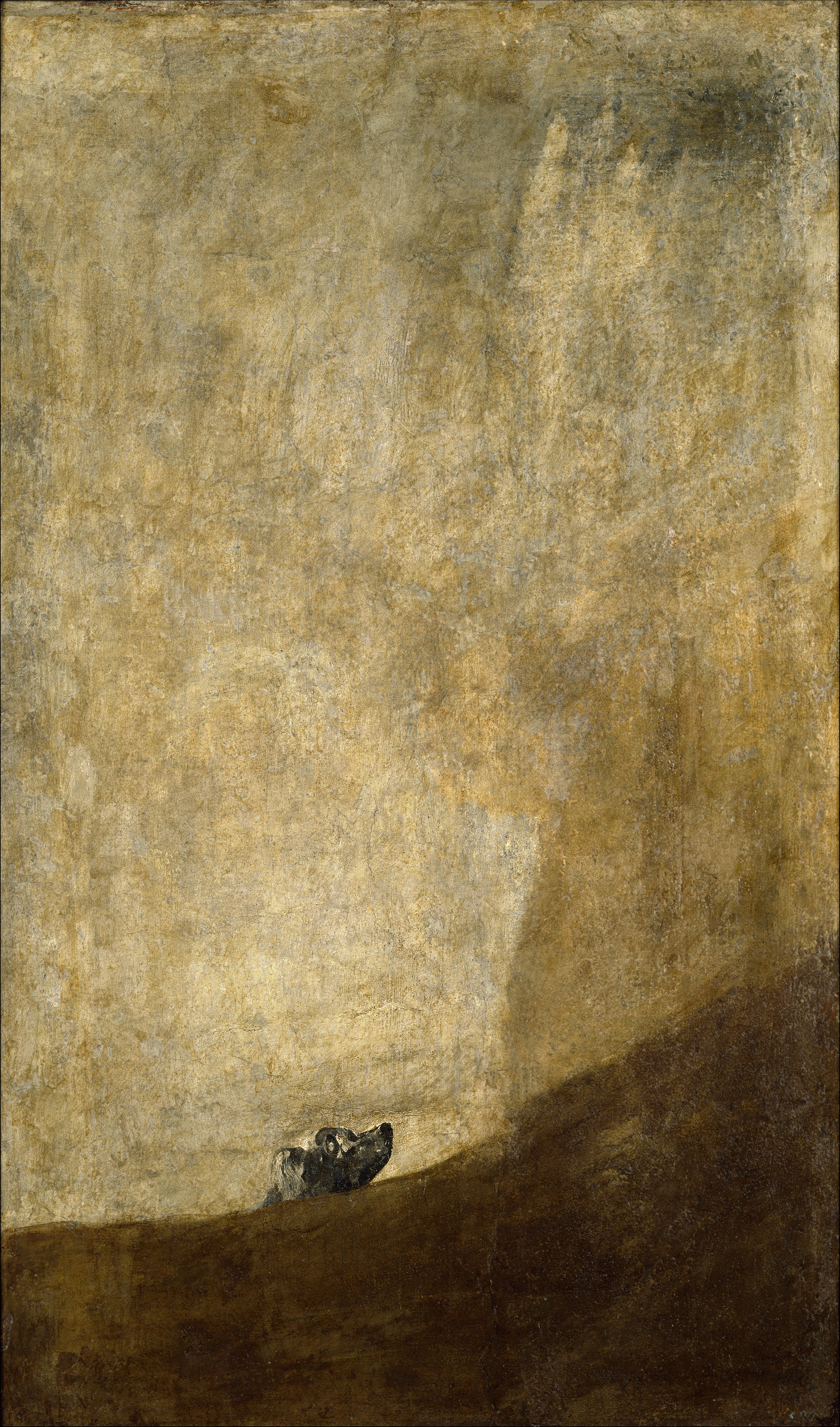
The Dog; Francisco de Goya; ca. 1819–1823; mural transferred to canvas, 131.5 × 79.3 cm.; Museo del Prado

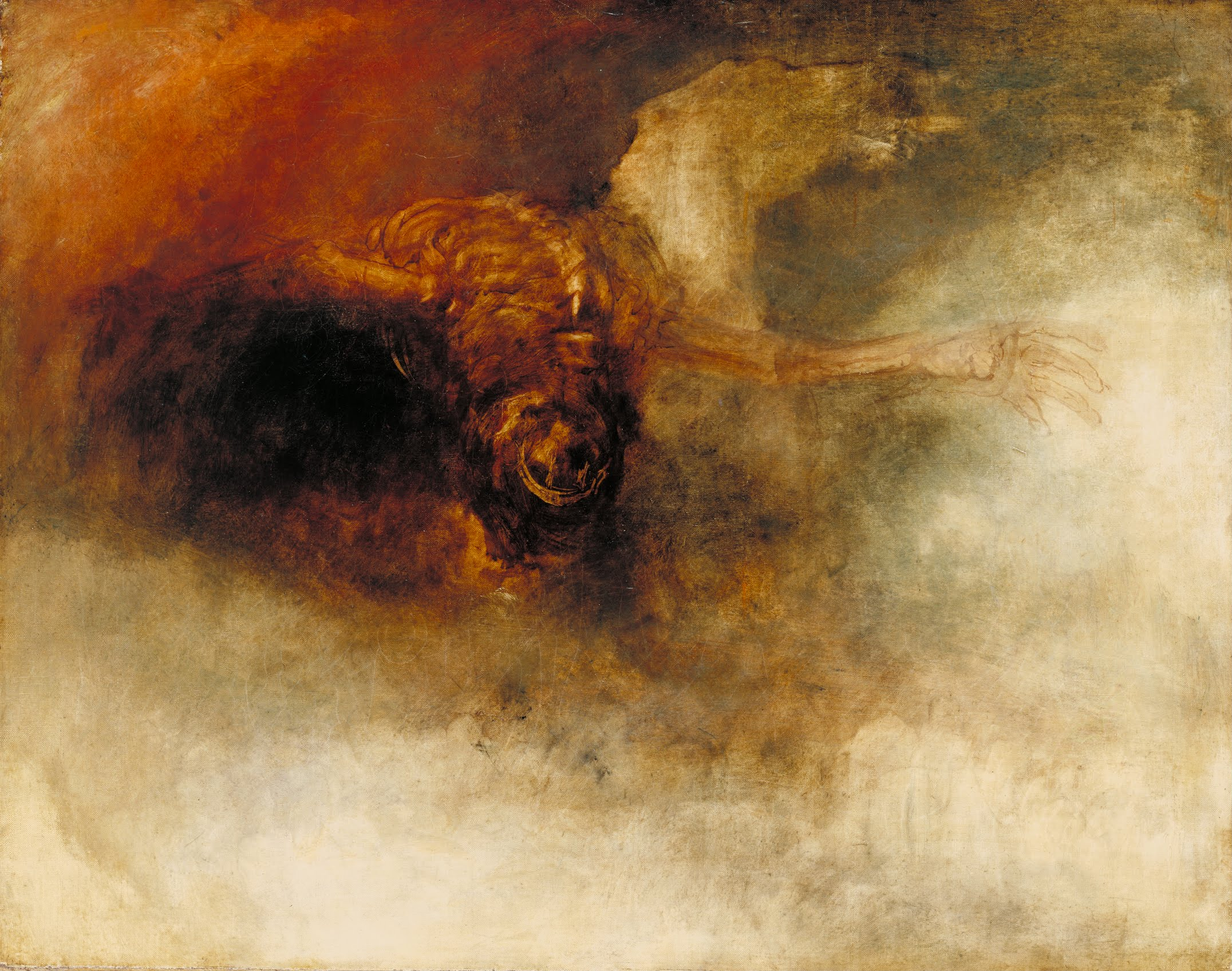
Death on a Pale Horse; J. M. W. Turner; c. 1830; oil on canvas, 60 × 76 cm.; Tate Britain

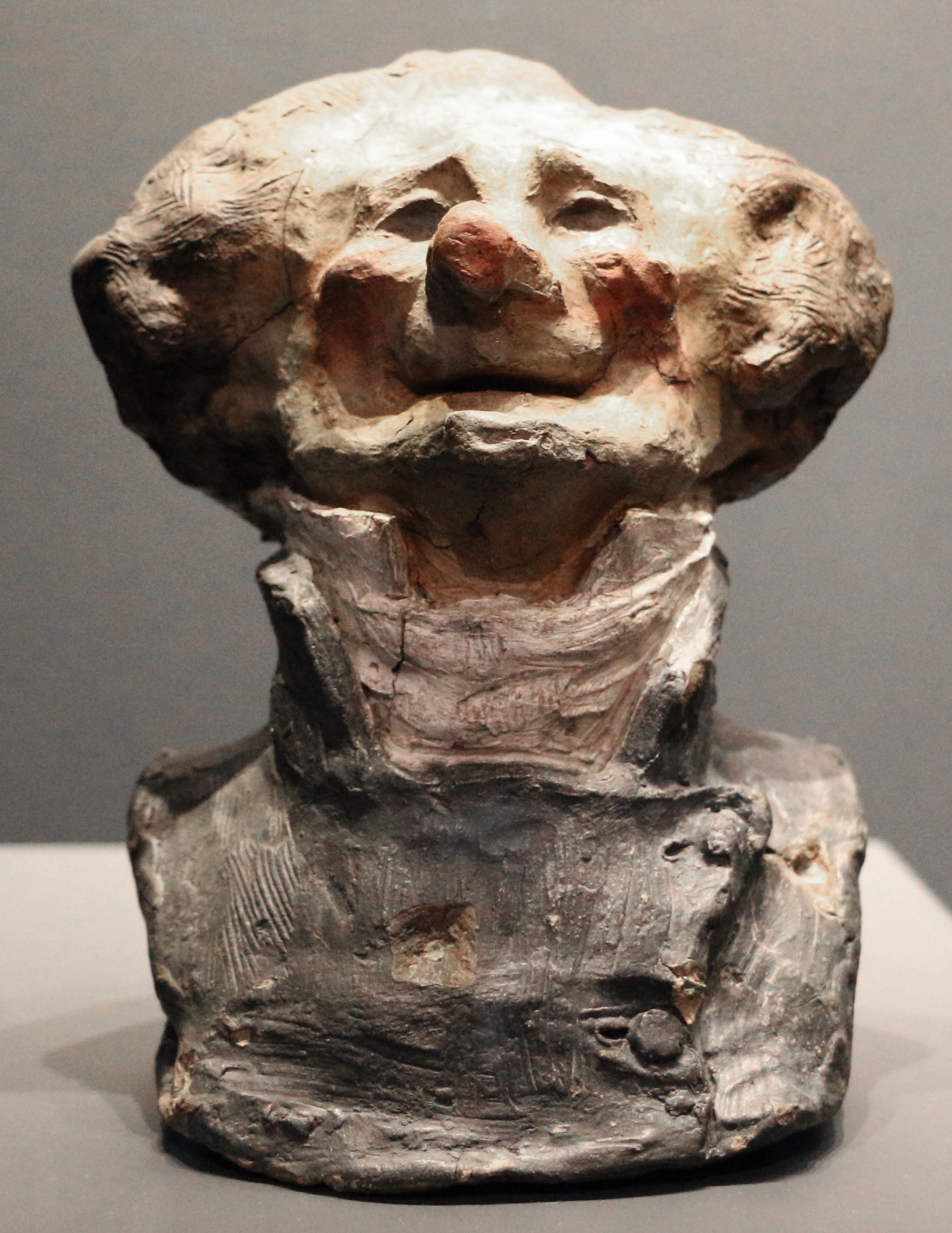
Toothless Man Laughing, Charles Philipon form Célébrités du Juste milieu; Honoré Daumier; 1832–33; painted clay, 16.4 x 13 x 10.6 cm; Musée d'Orsay

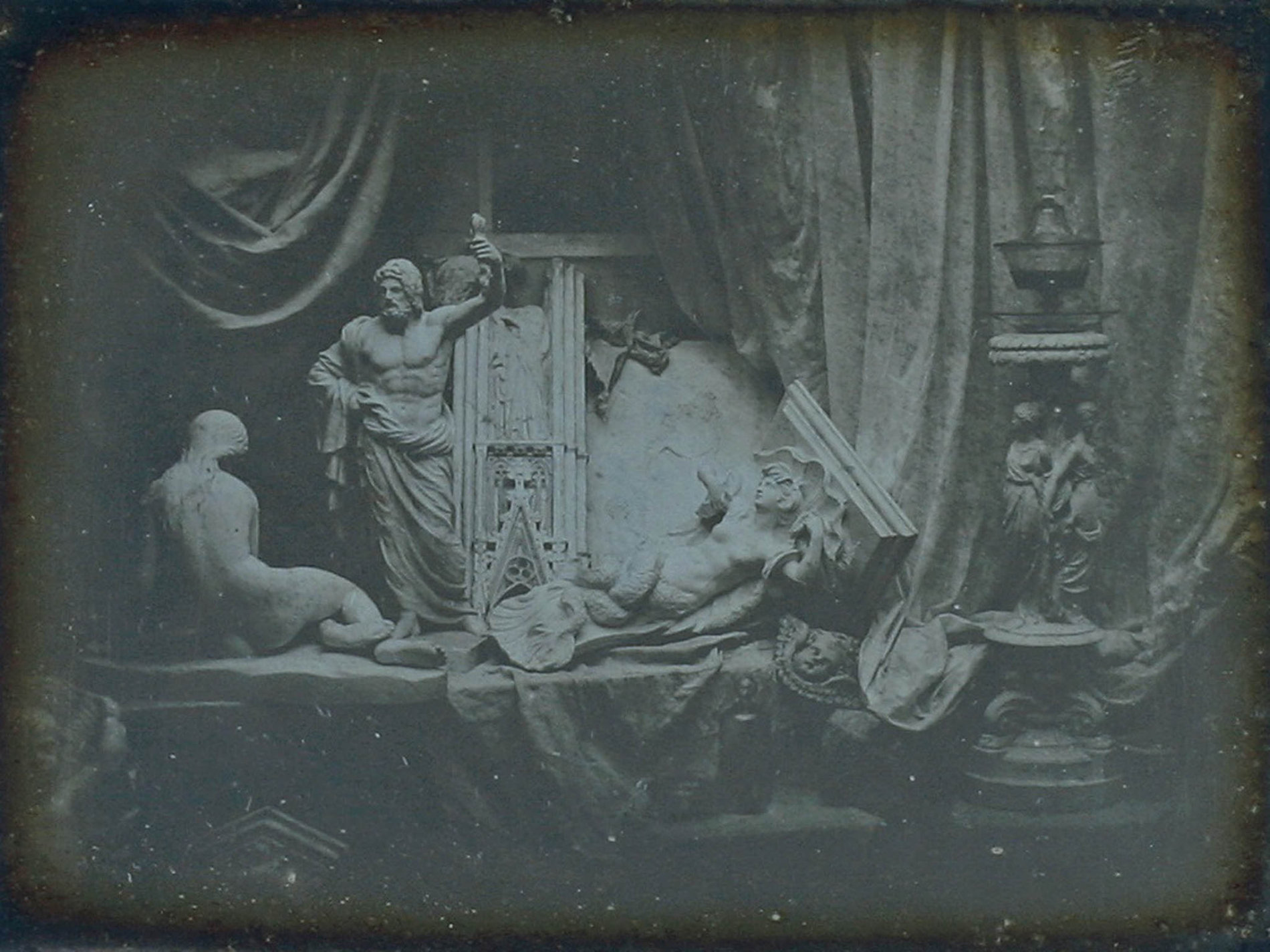
Still life with statue of Jupiter Tonans; by Louis Jacques Daguerre; c. 1839; daguerreotype

=== 19th century ===
==== Romanticism (c. 1790–1880) ====
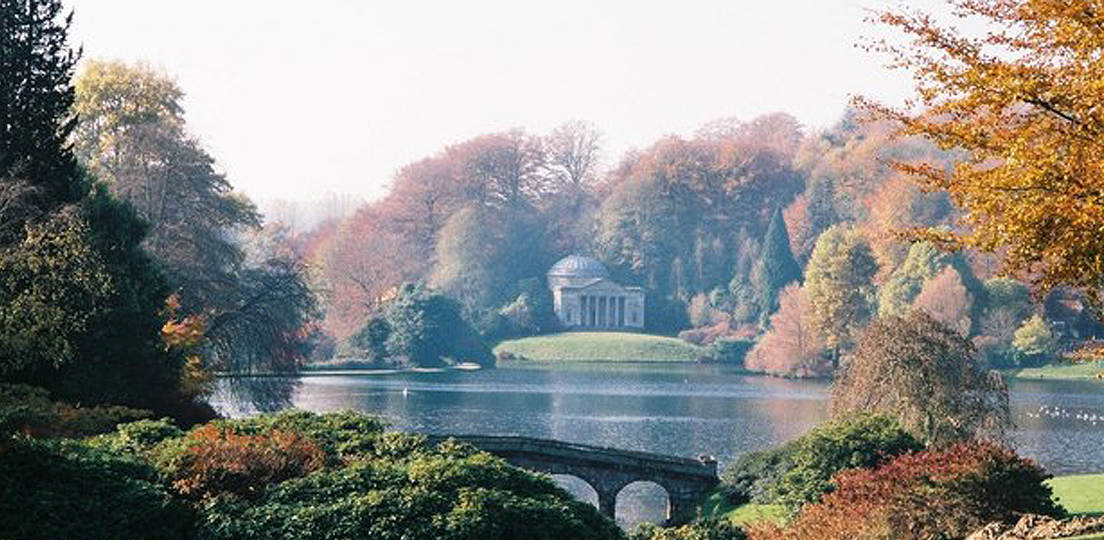
English landscape garden at Stourhead (the UK), the 1740s, by Henry Hoare

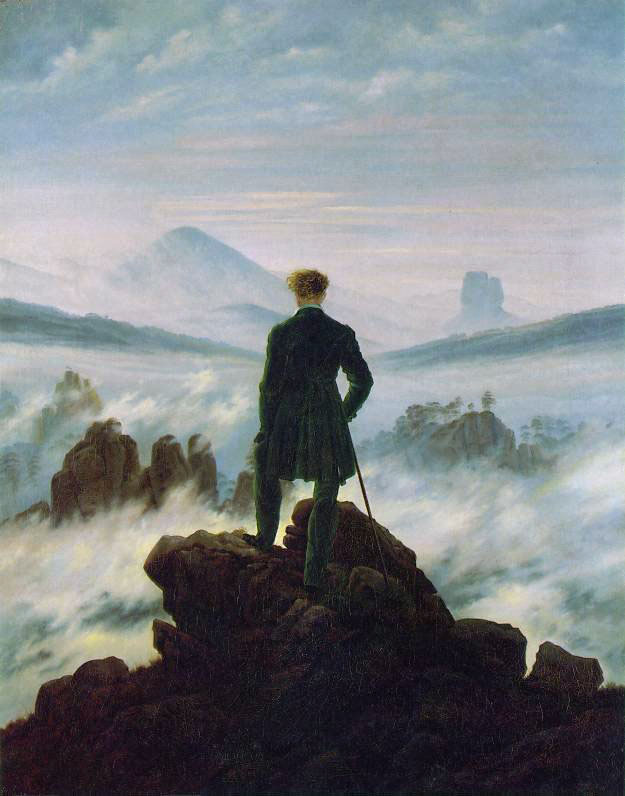
Wanderer above the Sea of Fog, 1818, by Caspar David Friedrich

Romanticism emerged in the late 18th century out of the German Sturm und Drang movement and flourished in the first half of the 19th century with significant and international manifestations in music, literature, and architecture, as well as the visual arts. It grew from a disillusionment with the rationalism of 18th century Enlightenment. Despite being often viewed as the opposite of Neoclassicism, there were some stylistic overlapping with both movements, and many Romantic artists were excited by classicism. The movement focused on intense emotions, imagination, and on the impressive power of nature, a bigger and more powerful force than the one of men, with its potential for disaster. "Neoclassicism is a new revival of classical antiquity... while Romanticism refers not to a specific style but to an attitude of mind that may reveal itself in any number of ways."

One of the earliest expressions of romanticism was in the English landscape garden, carefully designed to appear natural and standing in dramatic contrast to the formal gardens of the time. The concept of the "natural" English garden was adopted throughout Europe and America in the following decades. In architecture, the romantics frequently turned to alternative sources other than the Greek and Roman examples admired by the neo-classicist. Romantic architecture often revived Gothic forms and other styles such as exotic eastern models. The Palace of Westminster (Houses of Parliament), London is an example of romantic architecture that is also referred to as Gothic Revival. In painting romanticism is exemplified by the paintings of Francisco Goya in Spain, Eugène Delacroix and Théodore Géricault in France, William Blake, Henry Fuseli, Samuel Palmer, and William Turner in England, Caspar David Friedrich and Philipp Otto Runge in Germany, Francesco Hayez in Italy, Johan Christian Claussen Dahl in Norway, and Thomas Cole in America. Examples of sculptors of the romantic period include Antoine-Louis Barye, Jean-Baptiste Carpeaux, Auguste Préault, and François Rude. As romanticism ran its course, some aspects of the movement evolved into symbolism.

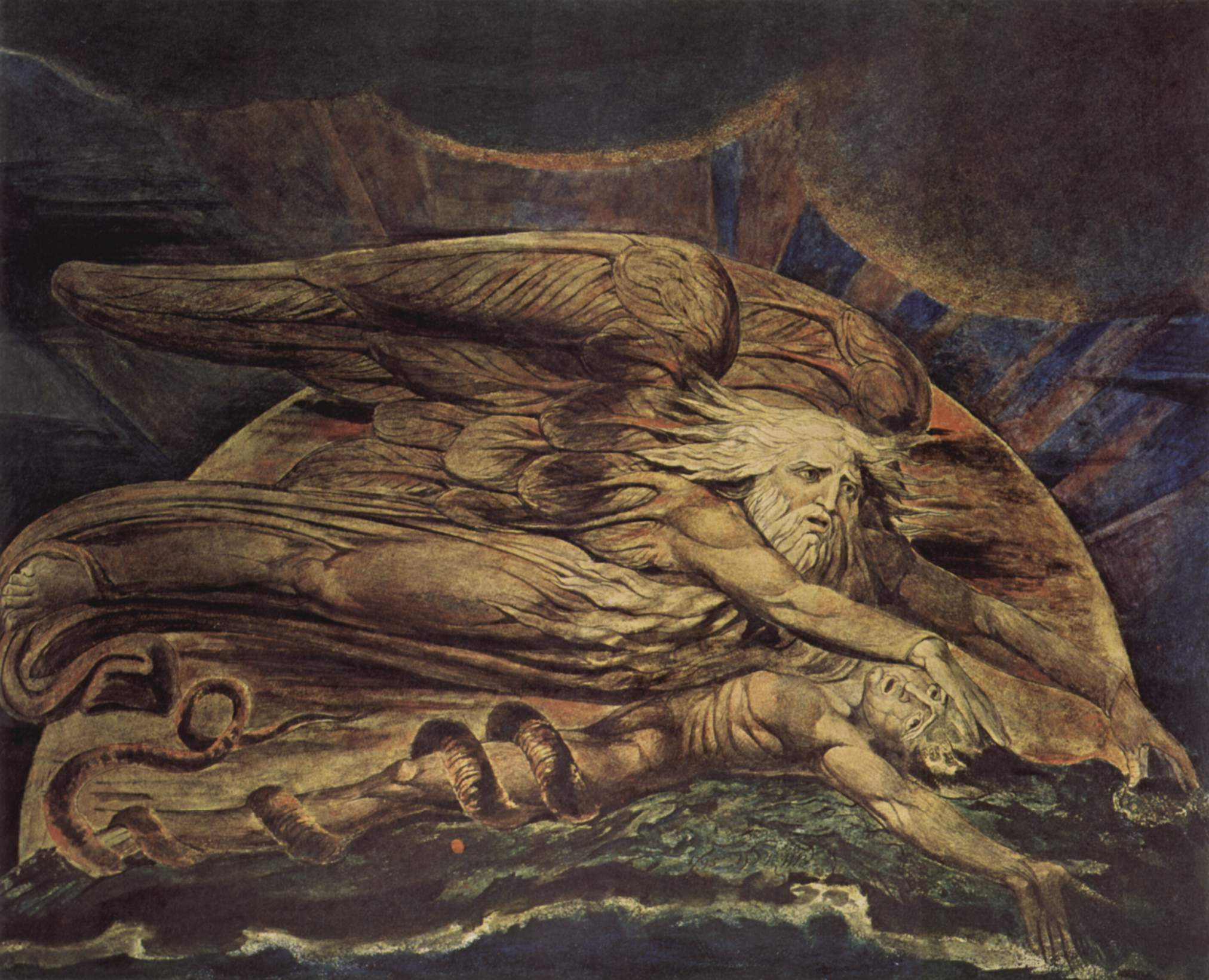
Elohim Creating Adam; by William Blake; 1795; color print finished in ink and watercolour on paper; 43.1 × 53.6 cm; Tate Britain (London)

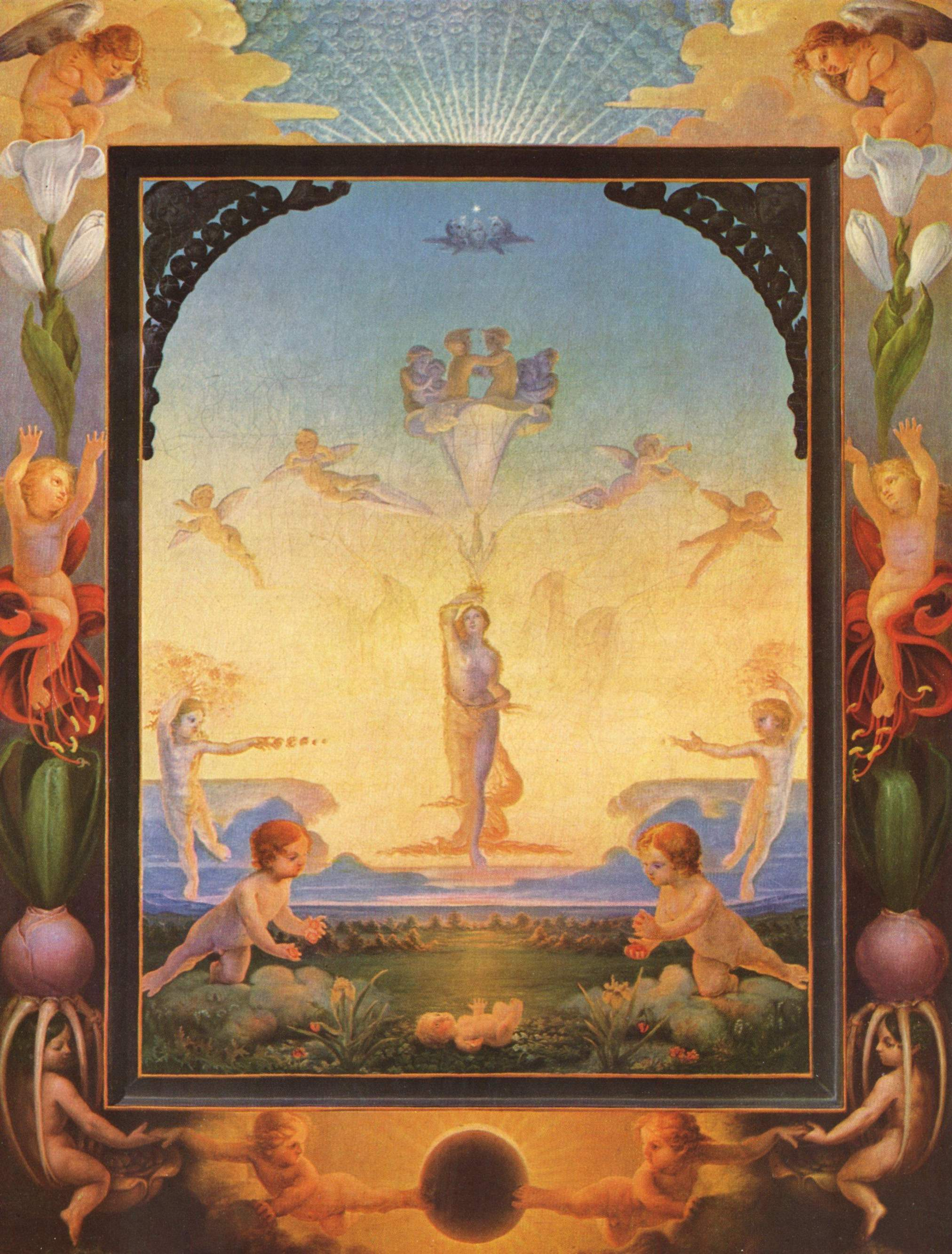
The Morning, by Philipp Otto Runge, 1808

The Third of May 1808; by Francisco Goya; 1814; oil on canvas; 2.68 × 3.47 m; Museo del Prado (Madrid, Spain)

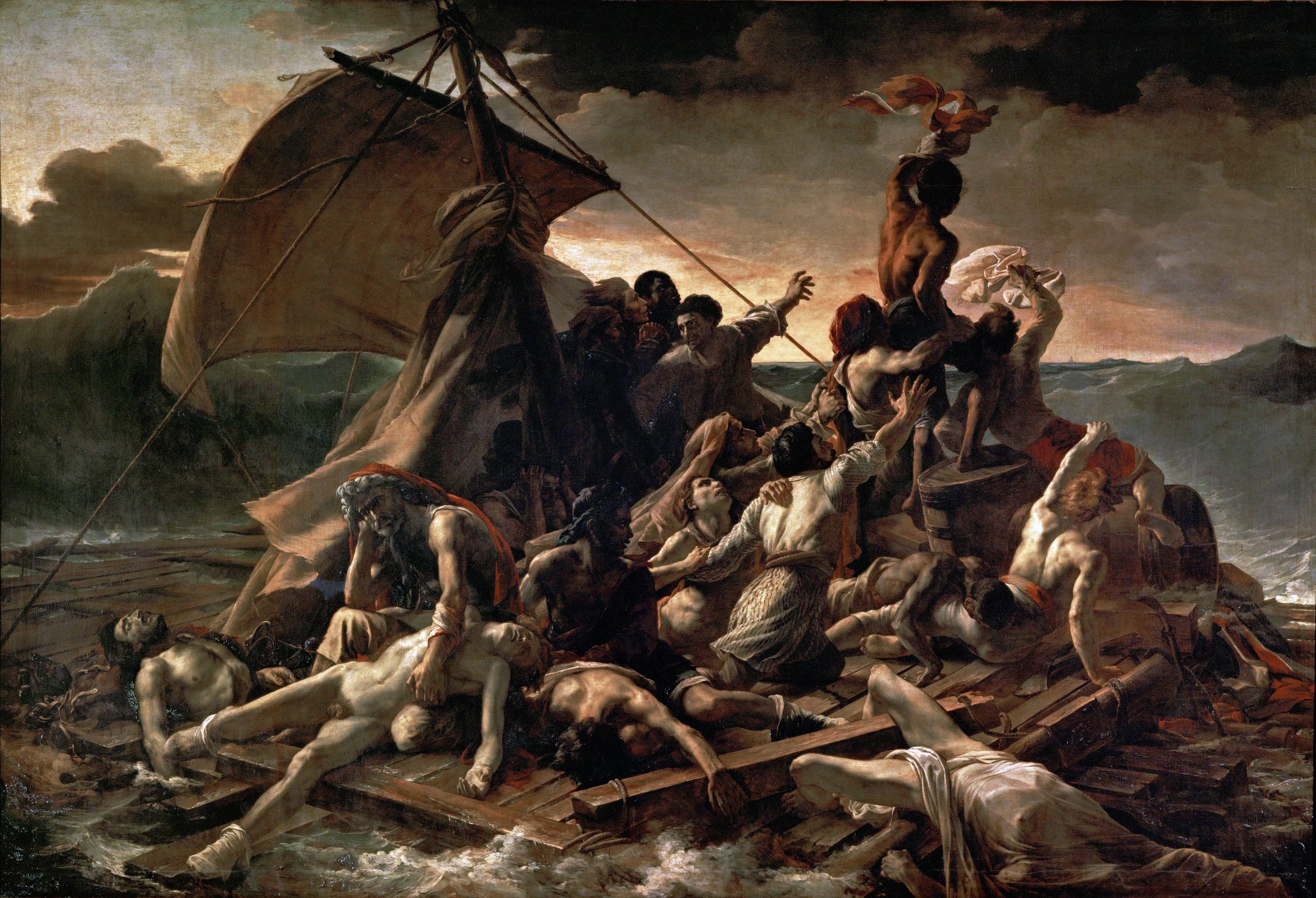
The Raft of the Medusa; by Théodore Géricault; 1819; oil on canvas; 4.91 × 7.16 m; Louvre

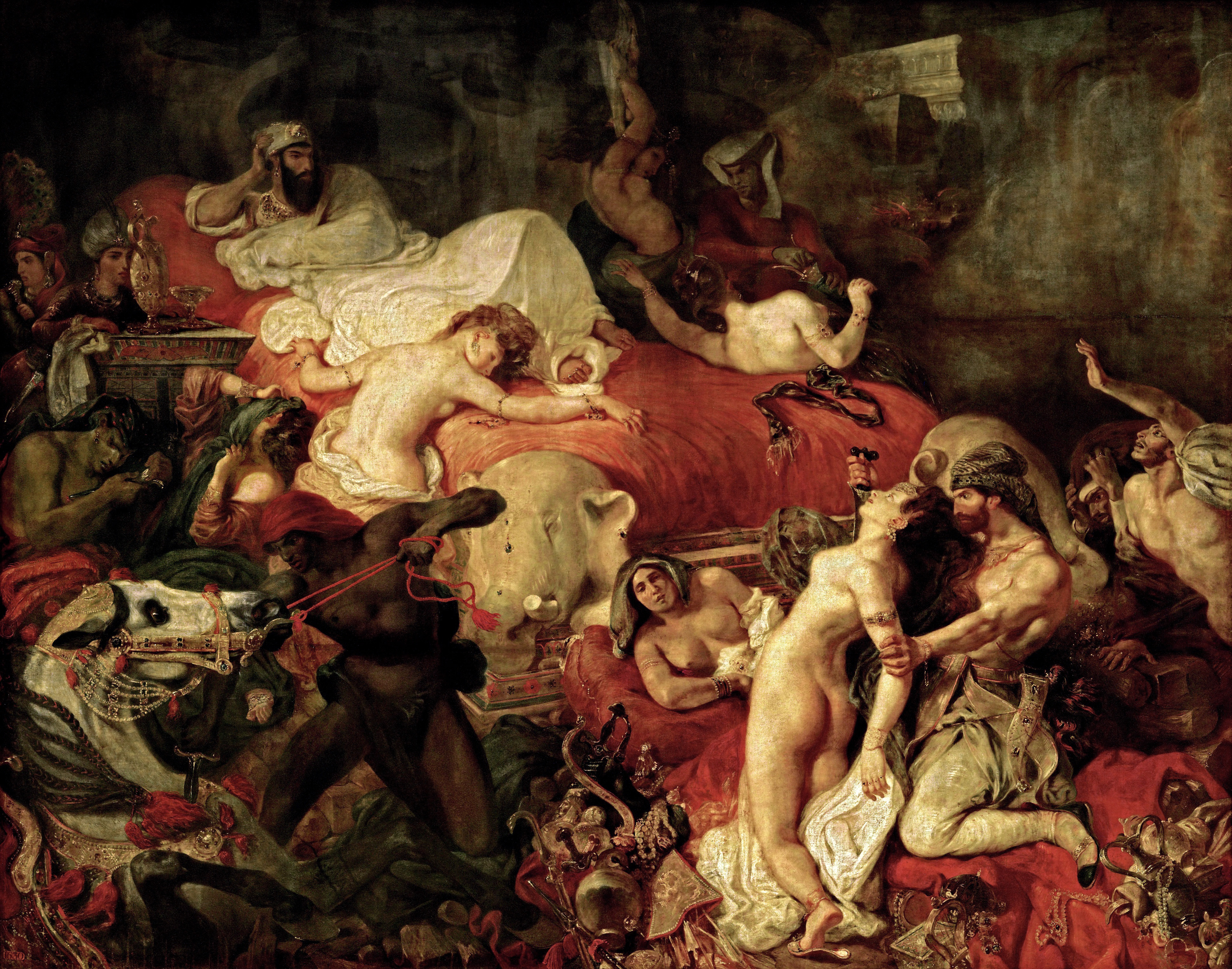
The Death of Sardanapalus; by Eugène Delacroix; 1827; oil on canvas; 3.92 × 4.96 m; Louvre

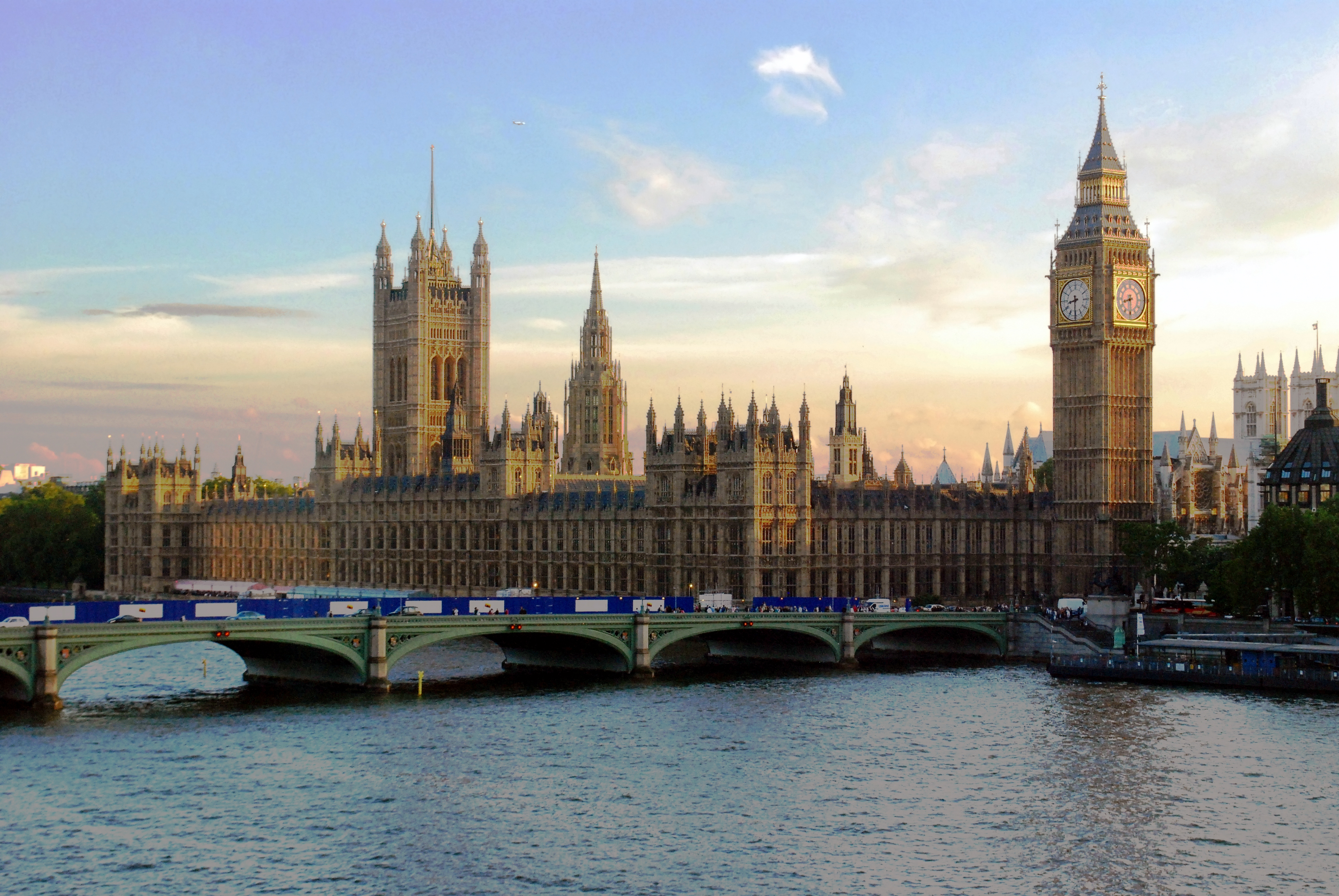
Palace of Westminster (London), 1840–1870, by Sir Charles Barry and A. Welby Pugin

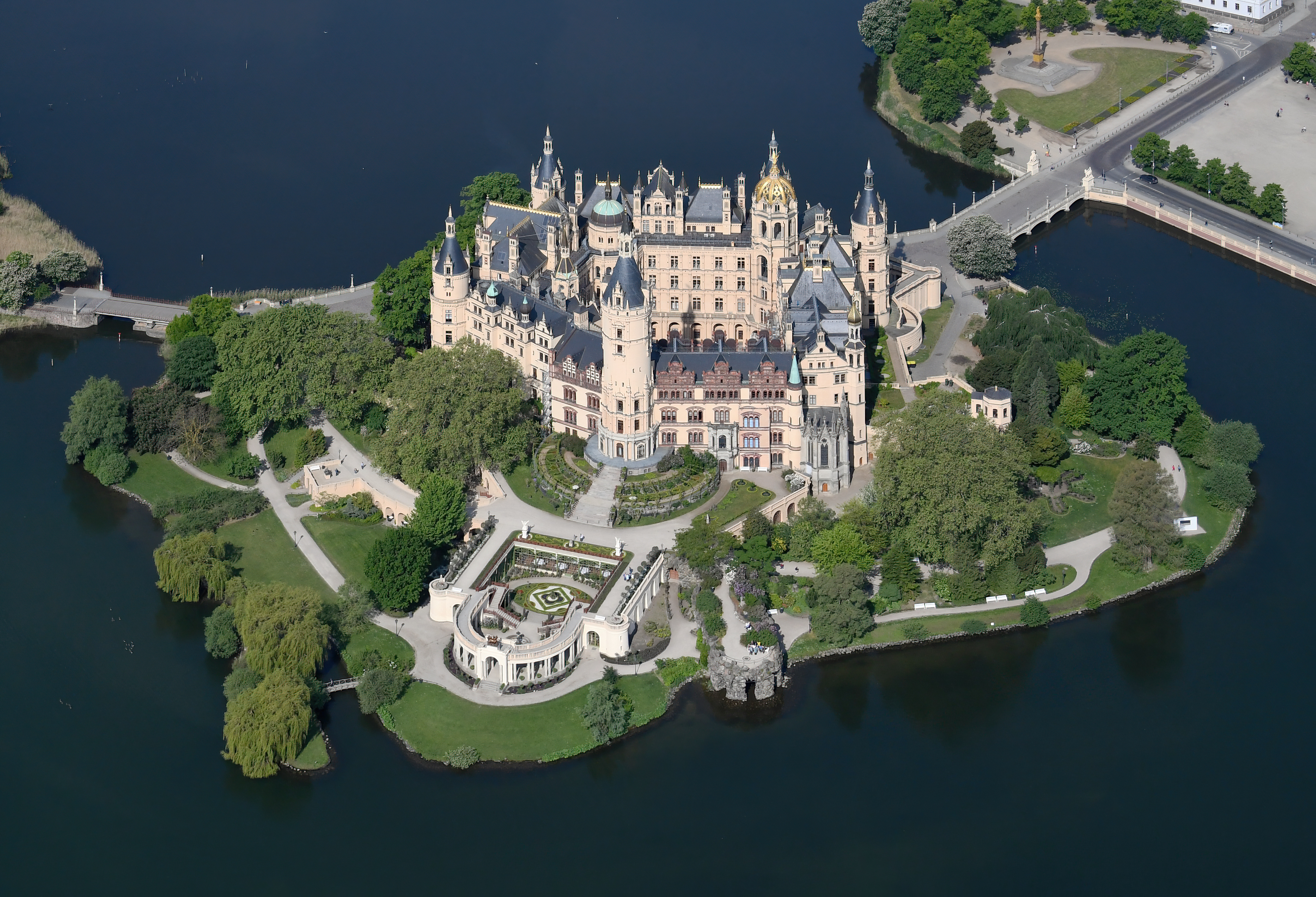
Schwerin Castle, Schwerin, Mecklenburg-Vorpommern, Germany, 1845-1857, by Gottfried Semper, Friedrich August Stüler, Georg Adolf Demmler and Ernst Friedrich Zwirner

==== Academism ====
Academism is the codification of art into rules that can be learned in art academies. It promotes the Classical ideals of beauty and artistic perfection. There was also a very strict hierarchy of subjects. At the top, there were paintings that depicted historic events, including the biblical and Classical ones, followed by the portrait and by the landscape. At the bottom of the hierarchy were still life and genre painting. Nicolas Poussin was the artist whose works and theories played the most significant role in the development of academism. The values of academism were situated in the centre of the Enlightenment project of discovering the basic principles and ideals of art.

During the 18th century, across all Europe, many academies were founded, that will later dominate the art of the 19th century. In order to study at an art academy, young artists had to take an admission exam, and after being admitted, they would study there for multiple years. Most of the 19th century French art movements were exterior or even opposing the values of academism.

Some of the most important artists of the French academy were William Bouguereau (1825–1905), Jean-Léon Gérôme (1824–1904), Alexandre Cabanel (1823–1889) and Thomas Couture (1815–1879). Academic art is closely related to Beaux-Arts architecture, which developed in the same place and holds to a similar classicizing ideal. The Beaux-Arts style takes its name from the École des Beaux-Arts in Paris, where it developed and where many of the main exponents of the style studied.

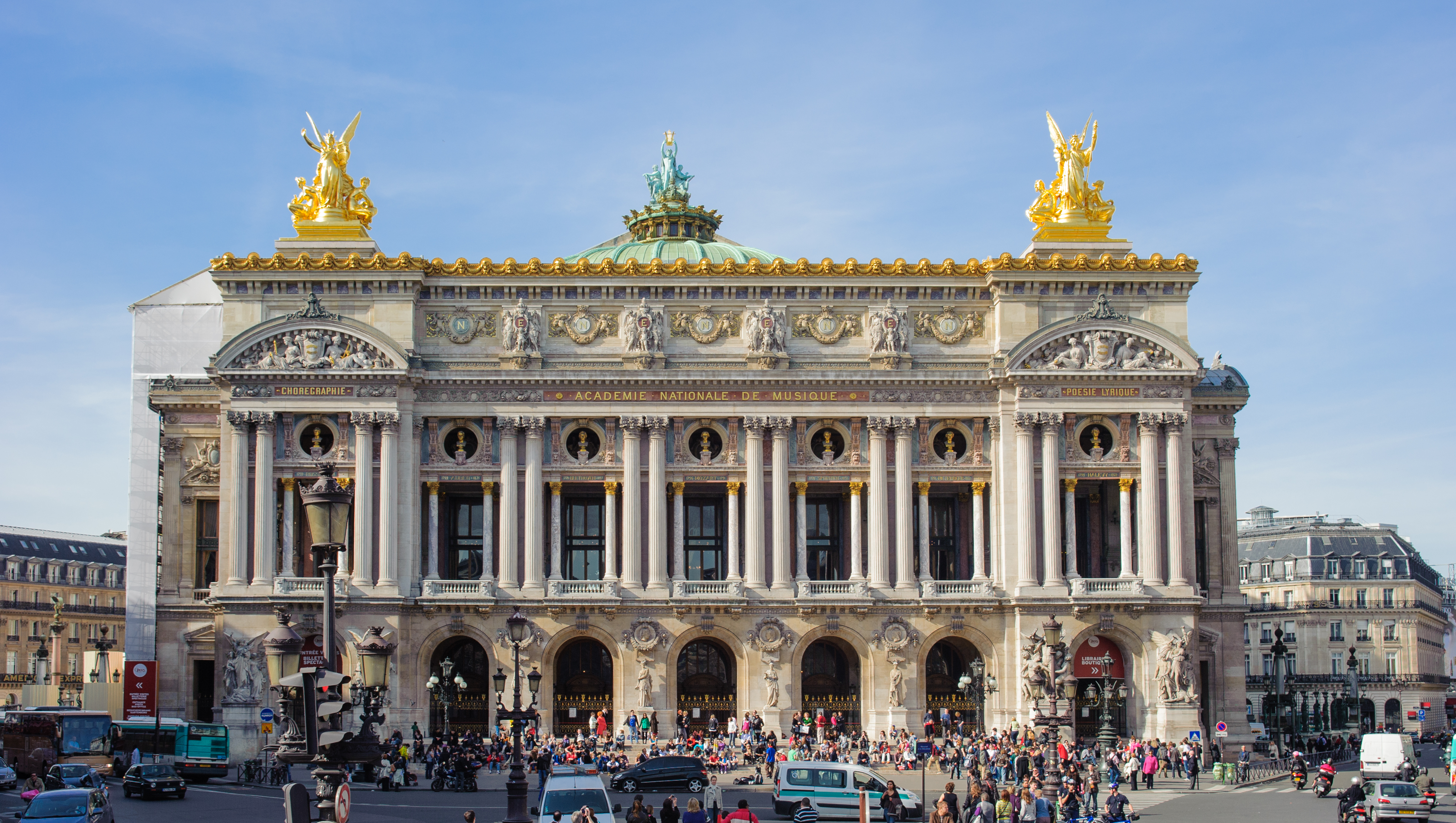
Palais Garnier (Paris), 1860–1875, by Charles Garnier

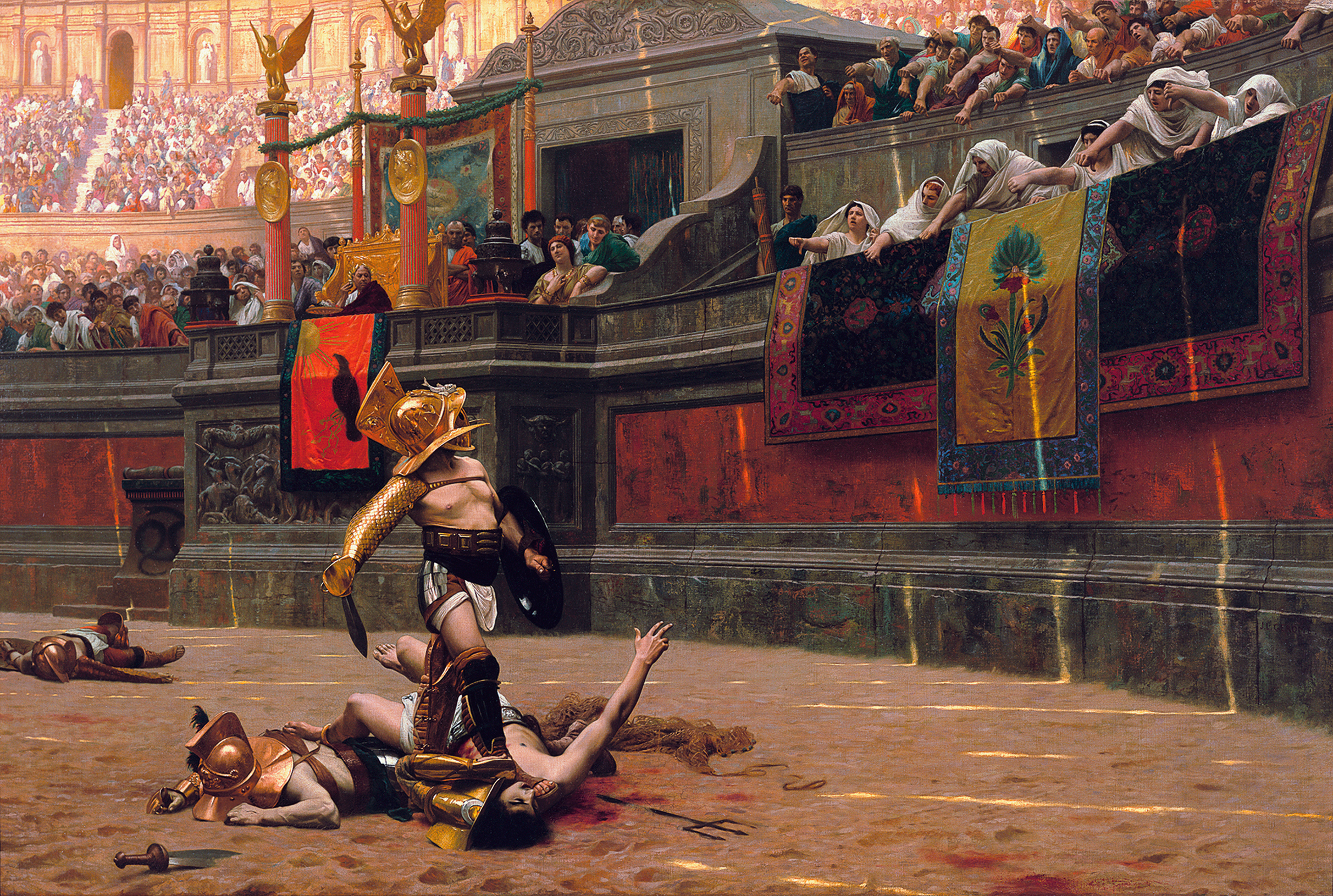
Pollice Verso (Thumbs Down); by Jean-Léon Gérôme; 1872; oil on canvas; height: 96.5 cm; Phoenix Art Museum (Phoenix, Arizona, US)

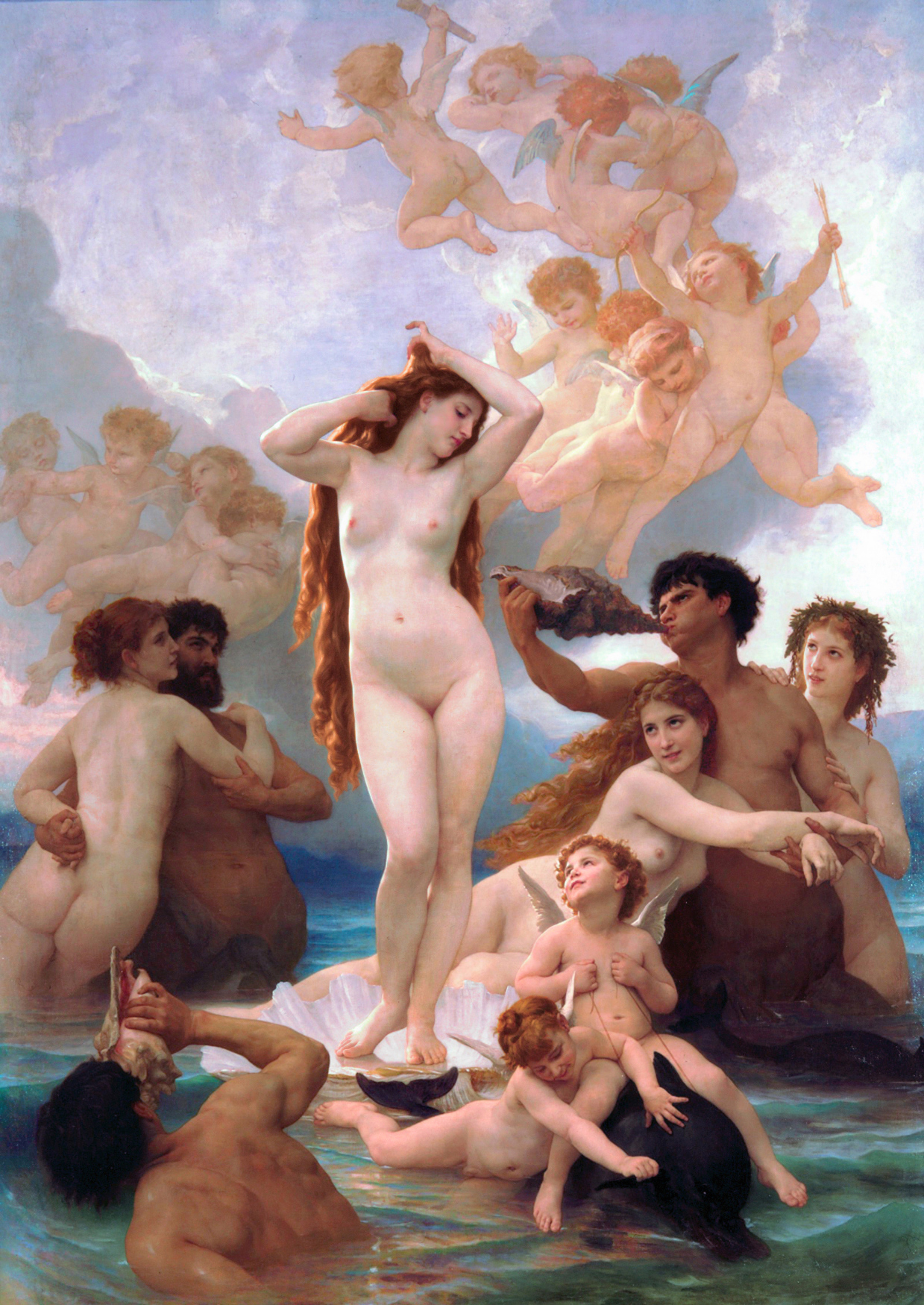
The Birth of Venus; by William-Adolphe Bouguereau; 1879; oil on canvas; 300 x 215 cm; Musée d'Orsay (Paris)

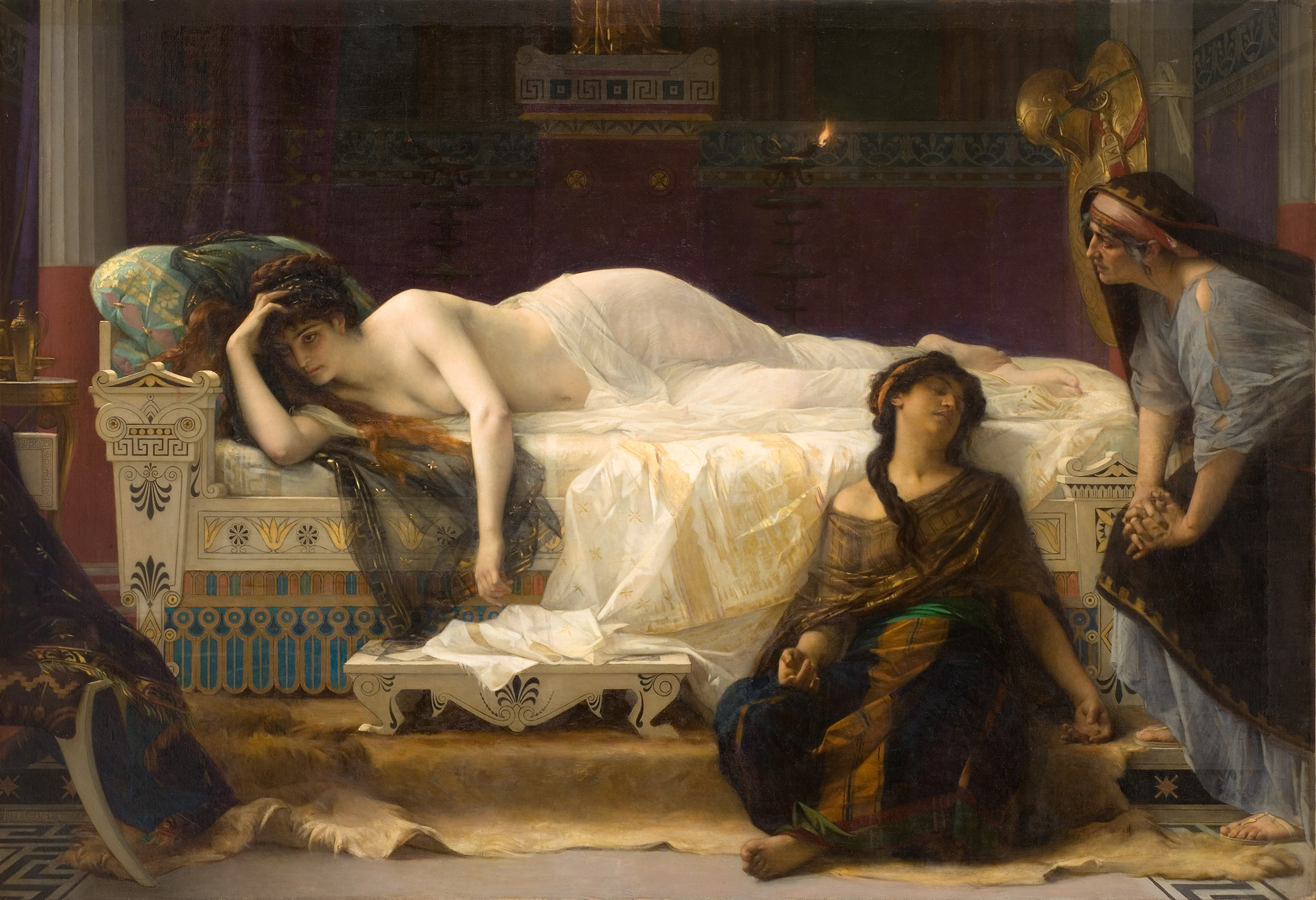
Phaedra; by Alexandre Cabanel; 1880; oil on canvas; 194 x 286 cm; Musée Fabre (Montpellier, France)

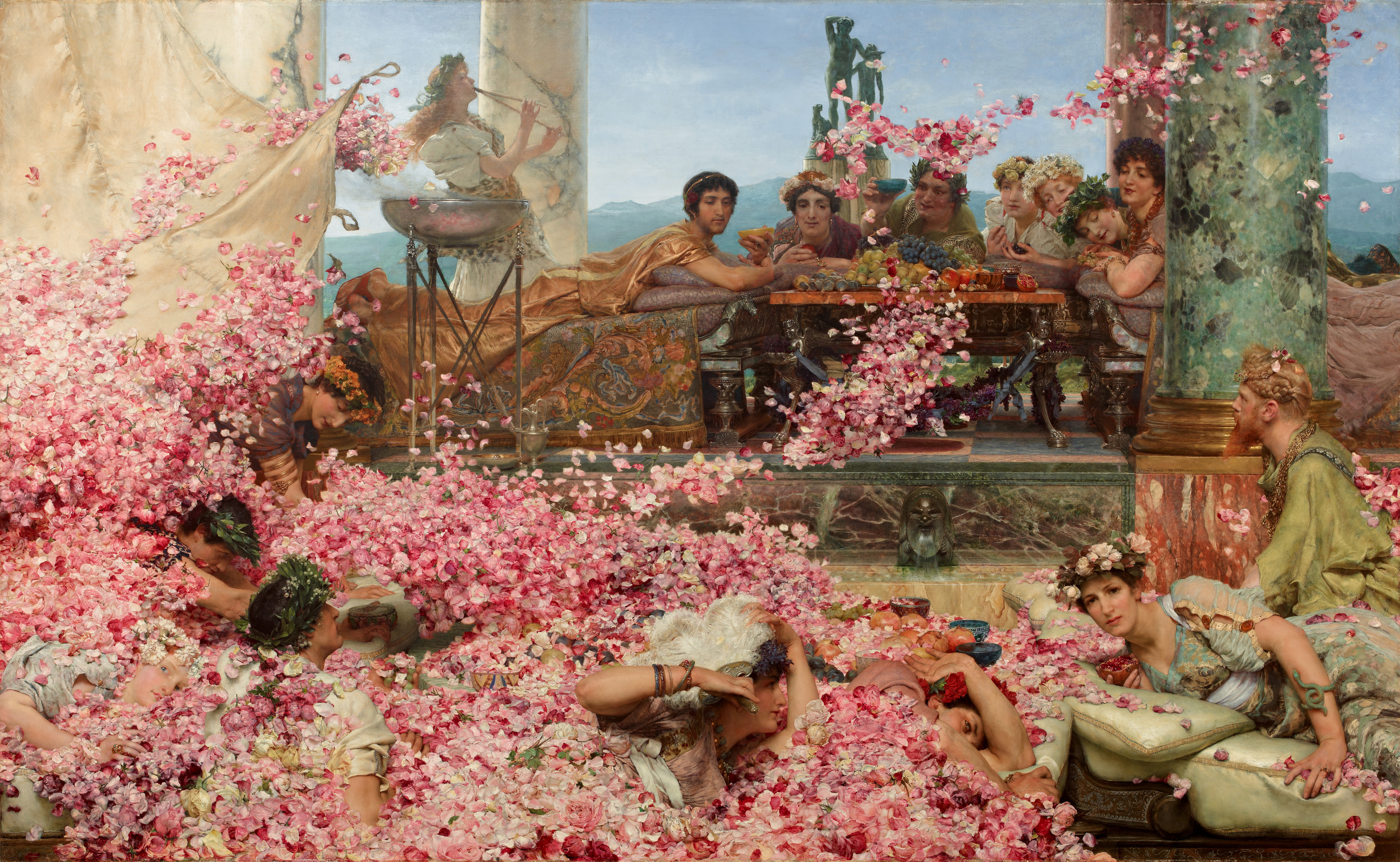
The Roses of Heliogabalus; by Lawrence Alma-Tadema; 1888; oil on canvas; 1.3 x 2.1 m; private collection of Juan Antonio Pérez Simón

===== Revivalism and Eclecticism =====
When it comes to architecture and applied arts, the 19th century is best known as the century of revivals. One of the most well-known revivalist styles is the Gothic Revival or Neo-Gothic, which first appeared in the mid-18th century in a few houses in England, like the Strawberry Hill House in London. However, these houses were isolated cases, since the beginning of the 19th century was dominated by Neoclassicism. Later, between 1830 and 1840, a taste and nostalgia for the rediscovery of past styles, ranging from the Middle Ages to the 18th century, developed under the influence of romanticism. Approximatively until World War I, rehashes of the past dominated the world of architecture and applied arts. Associations between styles and building types appeared, for example: Egyptian for prisons, Gothic for churches, or Renaissance Revival for banks and exchanges. These choices were the result of other associations: the pharaohs with death and eternity, the Middle Ages with Christianity, or the Medici family with the rise of banking and modern commerce. Sometimes, these styles were also seen in a nationalistic way, on the idea that architecture might represent the glory of a nation. Some of them were seen as 'national styles', like the Gothic Revival in the UK and the German states or the Romanian Revival in Romania. Augustus Pugin called the Gothic style the 'absolute duty' of the English architect, despite the fact that the style is of French origin. This way, architecture and the applied arts were used to grant the aura of a highly idealized glorious past. Some architects and designers associated historic styles, especially the medieval ones, with an idealized fantasy organic life, which they put in comparison with the reality of their time.

Despite revivalism being so prevalent, this doesn't mean that there was no originality in these works. Architects, ébénistes and other craftsmen, especially during the second half of the 19th century, created mixes of styles, by extracting and interpreting elements specific to certain eras and areas. This practice is known as eclecticism. This stylistic development occurred during a period when the competition of World's Fairs motivated many countries to invent new industrial methods of creation.

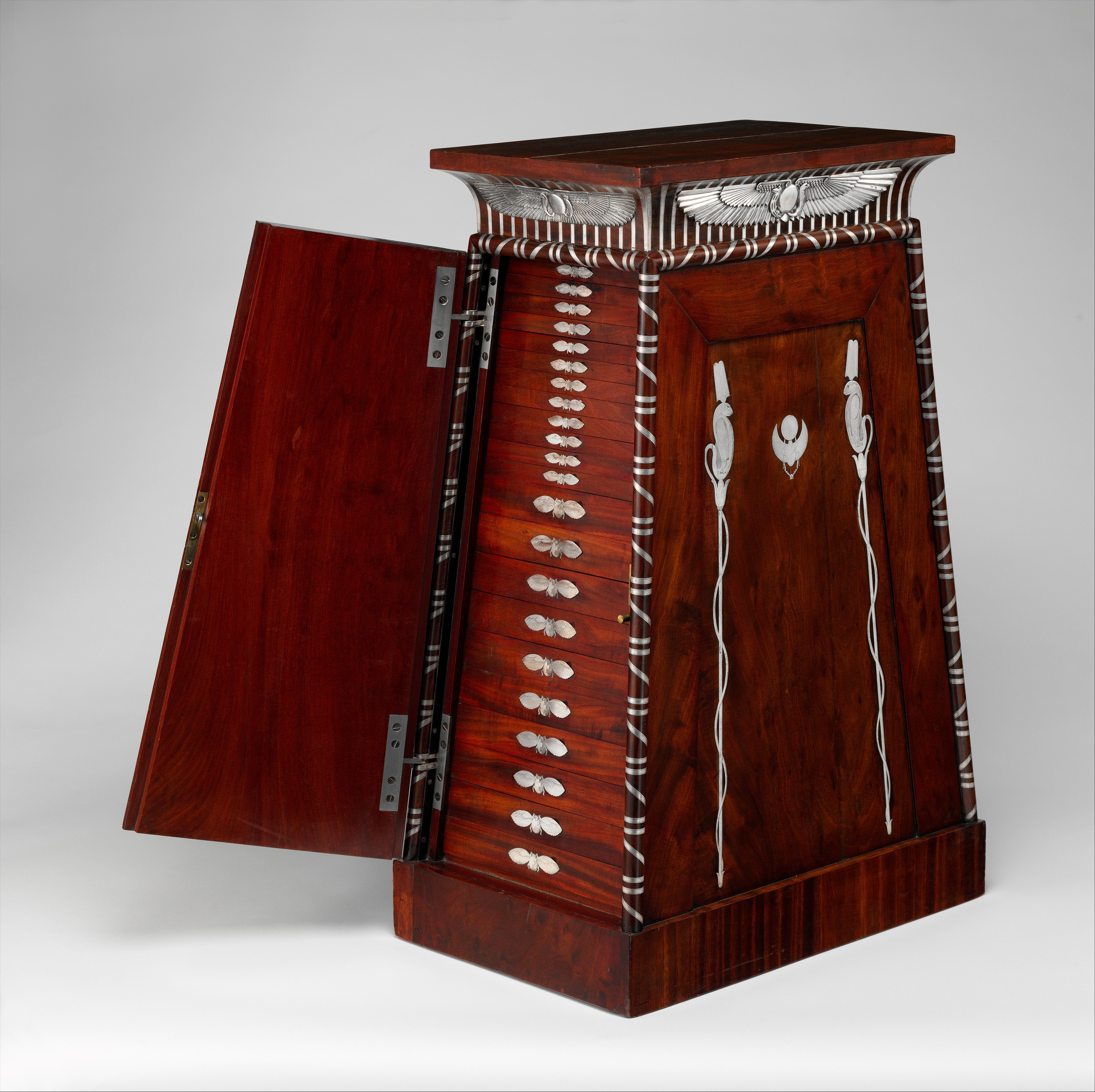
Egyptian Revival - Coin cabinet; 1809–1819; mahogany (probably Swietenia mahagoni), with applied and inlaid silver; 90.2 x 50.2 x 37.5 cm; Metropolitan Museum of Art

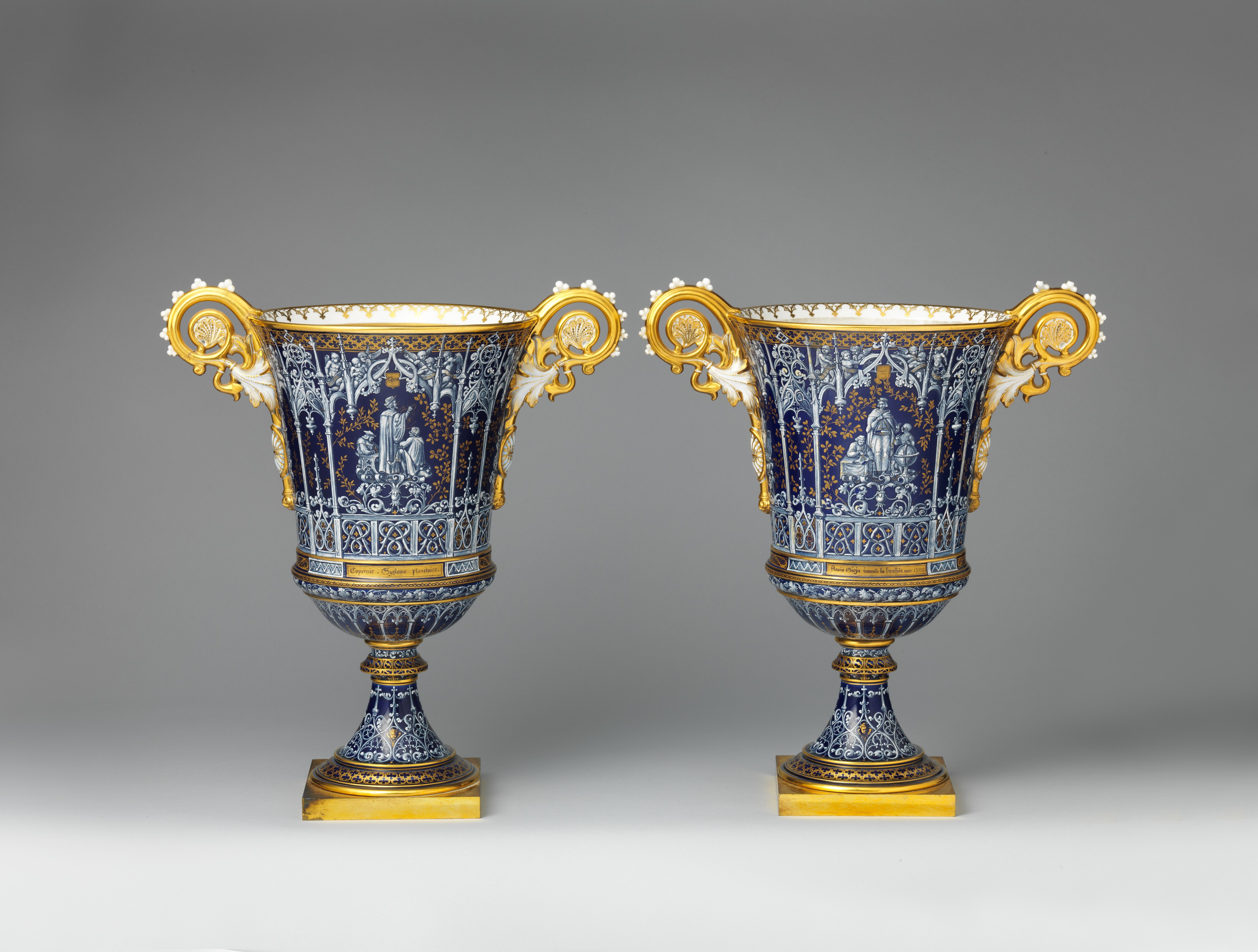
Gothic Revival - Pair of vases; manufactured in 1832, decorated in 1844; hard-paste porcelain; 36.4 x 32.7 x 20 cm; Metropolitan Museum of Art

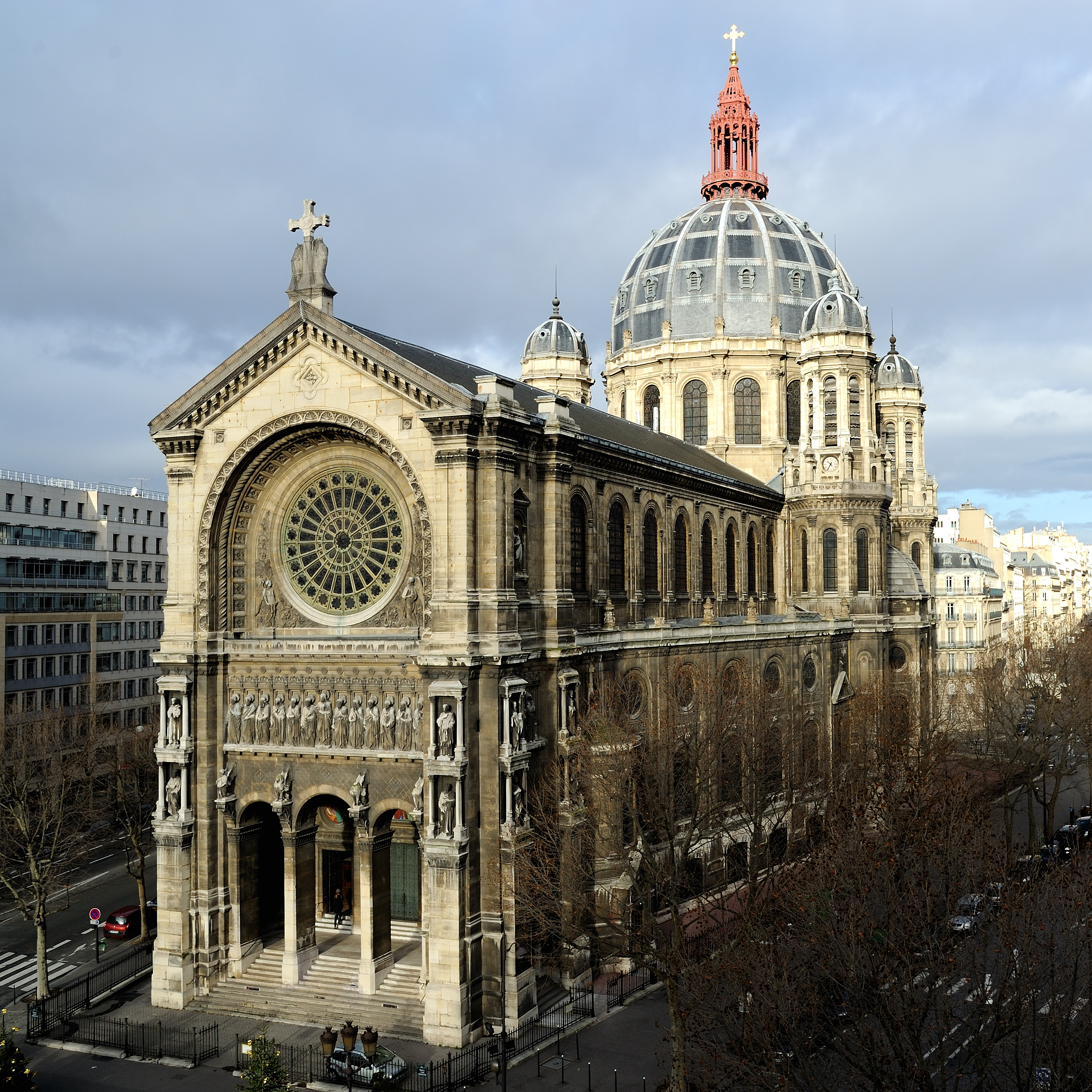
Eclectic - Église Saint-Augustin de Paris, 1860–1868, by Victor Baltard

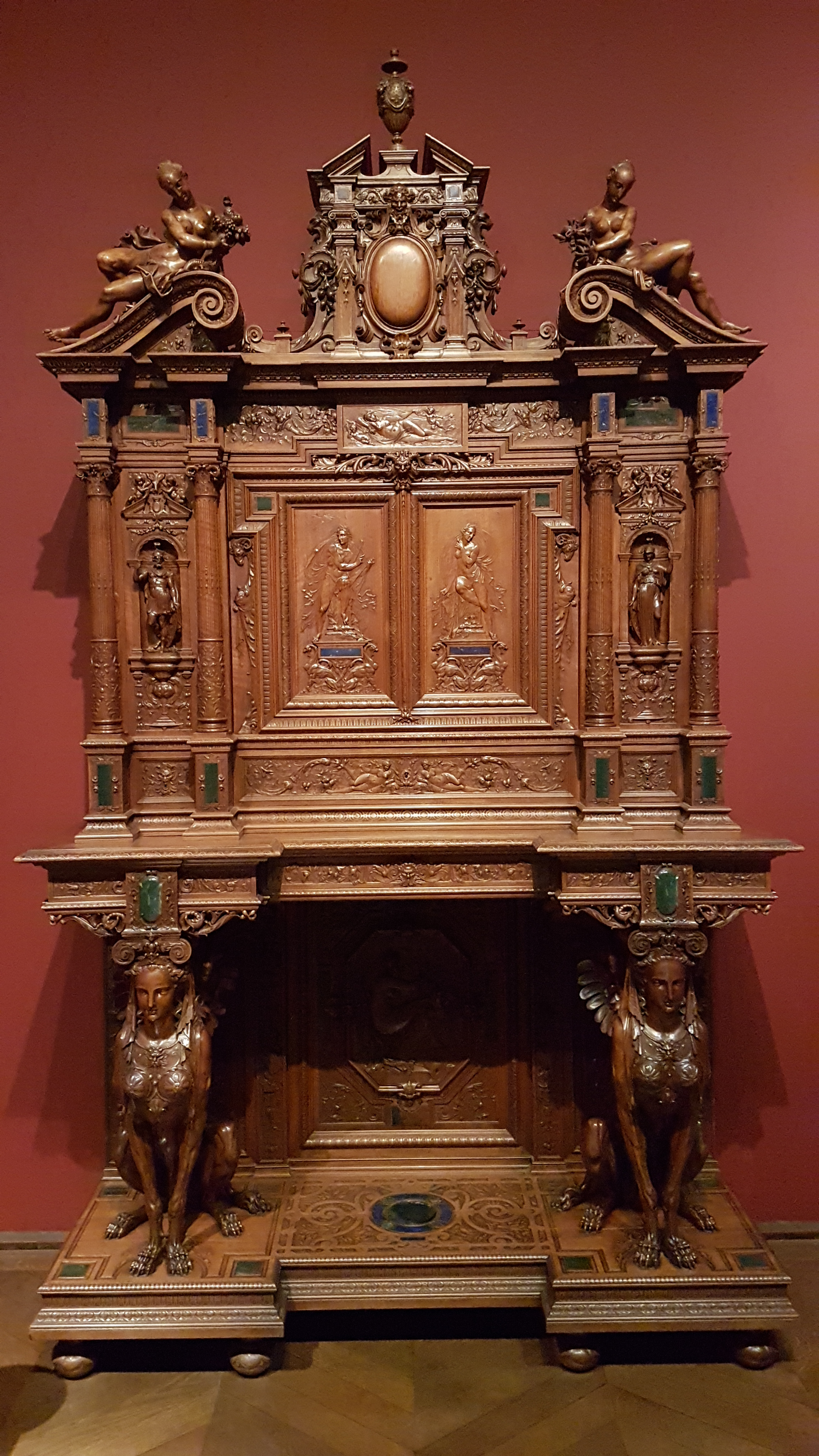
Renaissance Revival - Buffet; by Henri-Auguste Fourdinois, Nivillier, Party, Hugues Protat, Primo and Maigret; 1867; walnut, jasper and lapis lazuli marquetry, and ivory and silver-inlayed interior; unknown dimensions; Musée des Arts Décoratifs (Paris)

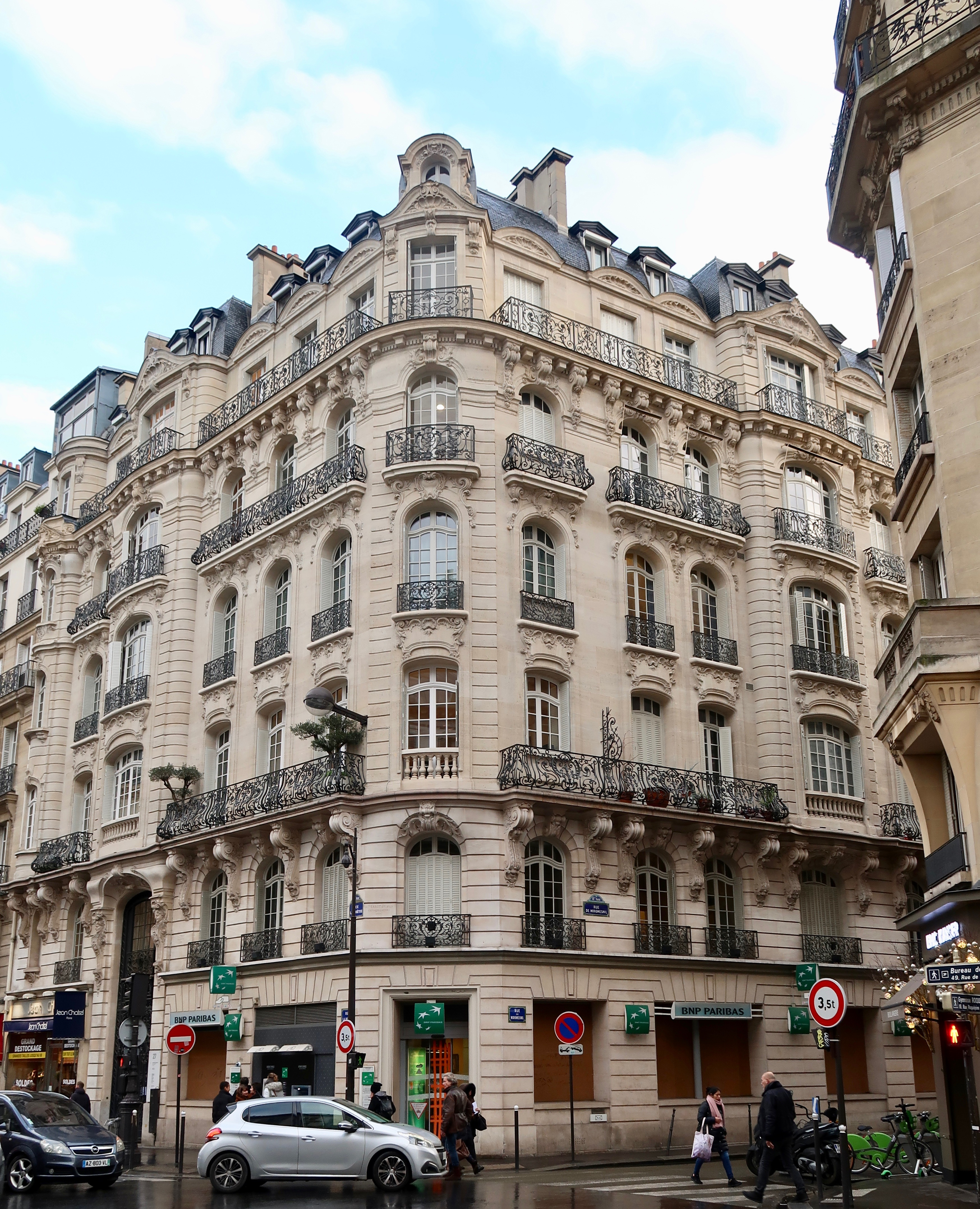
Rococo Revival - Apartment building no. 8 on Rue de Miromesnil (Paris), 1900, by P. Lobrot

==== Realism (c. 1830–1890) ====
Realism emerged in the mid-nineteenth century, c. 1840, and had counterparts in sculpture, literature, and drama, often referred to as Naturalism in literature. In nineteenth-century painting, the term Realism refers more to the subject matter depicted than to the style or technique. Realist paintings typically represent ordinary places and people engaged in everyday activities, as opposed to grand, idealized landscapes, mythological gods, biblical subjects, and historical figures and events that had often dominated painting in western culture. Courbet said "I cannot paint an angel because I have never seen one".

Realism was also in part a reaction to the often dramatic, exotic, and emotionally charged work of romanticism. The term realism is applied relative to the idealized imagery of neo-classicism and the romanticized imagery of romanticism. Artists such as Jean-Baptiste-Camille Corot and Honoré Daumier had loose associations with realism, as did members of the Barbizon School, particularly Jean-François Millet, but it was perhaps Gustave Courbet who was the central figure in the movement, self identifying as a realist, advocating realism, and influencing younger artists such as Édouard Manet. One significant aspect of realism was the practice of painting landscapes en plein air and its subsequent influence on impressionism.

Beyond France, realism is exemplified by artists such as Wilhelm Leibl in Germany, Ford Madox Brown in England, and Winslow Homer in the United States. Art historian H. H. Arnason wrote, "The chronological sequence of neo-classicism, romanticism, and realism is, of course, only a convenient stratification of movements or tendencies so inextricably bound up with one another and with the preceding movements that it is impossible to tell where one ended and another began", and this becomes even more pertinent and complex as one follows all of the movements and "isms" into the late 19th and early 20th centuries.

The Painter's Studio; by Gustave Courbet; 1854–1855; oil on canvas; 3.59 x 5.98 m; Musée d'Orsay (Paris)

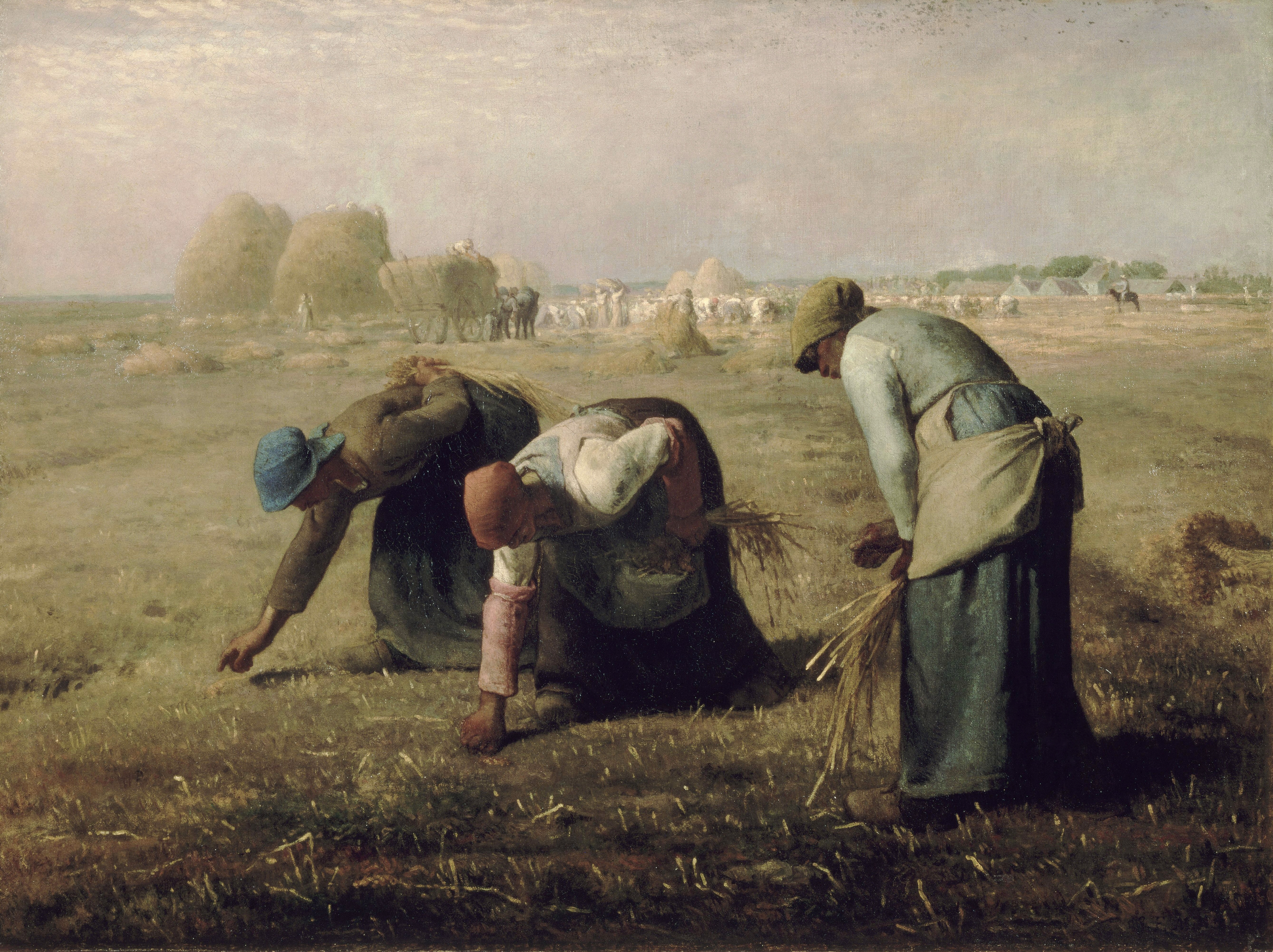
The Gleaners; by Jean-François Millet; 1857; oil on canvas; 0.84 x 1.12 m; Musée d'Orsay

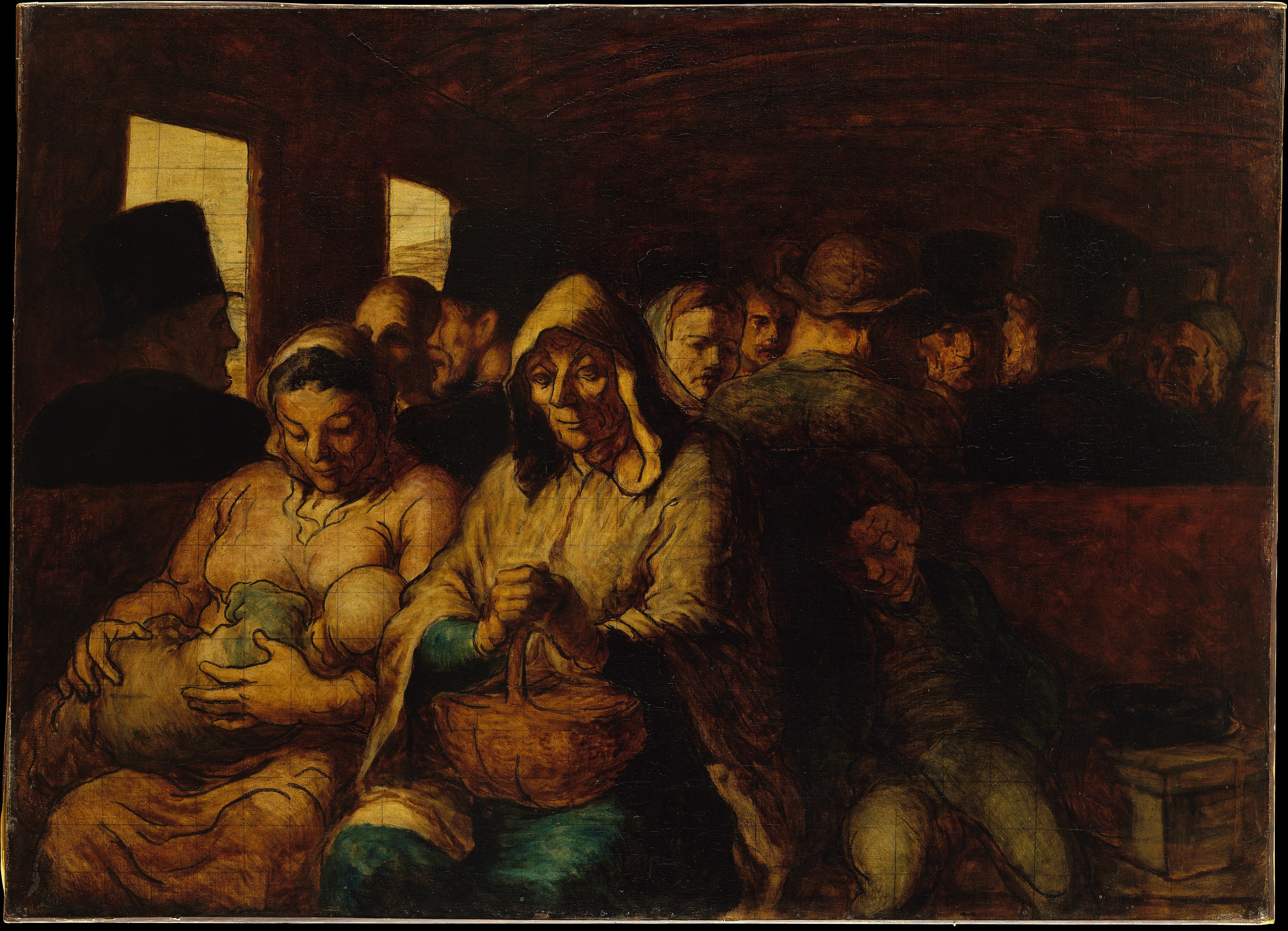
The Third-Class Carriage; by Honoré Daumier; c.1862–1864; oil on canvas; 65.4 x 90.2 cm; Metropolitan Museum of Art (New York City)

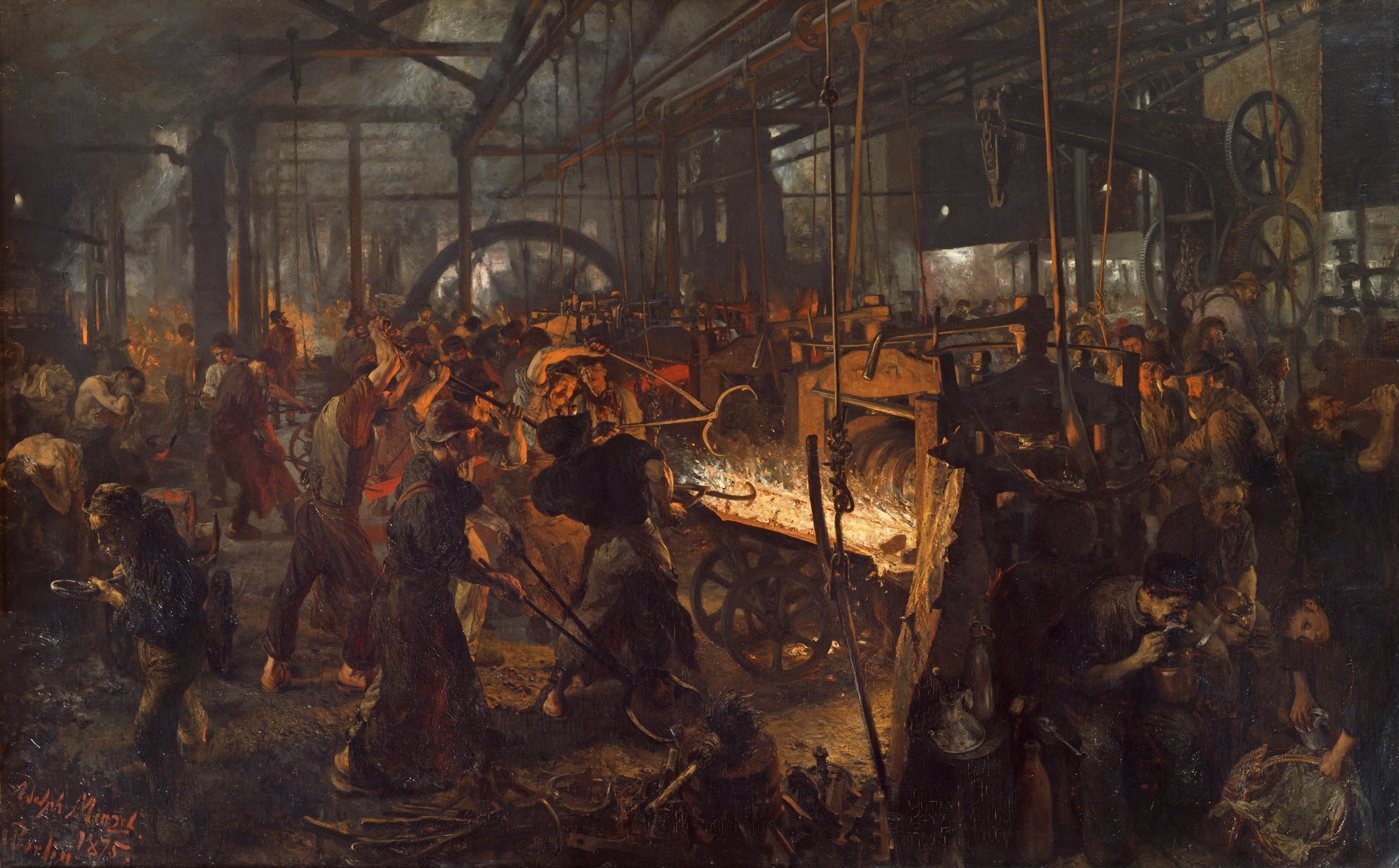
The Iron Rolling Mill; by Adolph von Menzel; 1875; oil on canvas; 153 x 253 cm; Alte Nationalgalerie (Berlin, Germany)

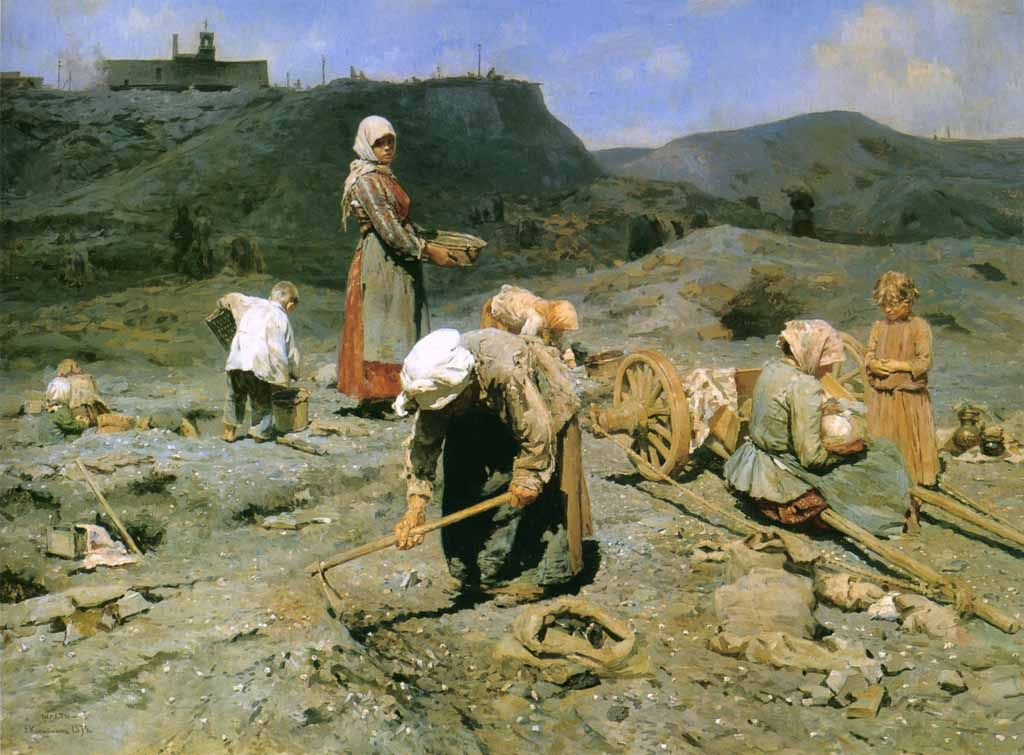
The Poor, Picking up Pieces of Coal; by Nikolay Kasatkin; 1894; oil on canvas; 80 x 107 cm; Russian Museum (Saint Petersburg, Russia)

==== Impressionism (c. 1865–1885) ====
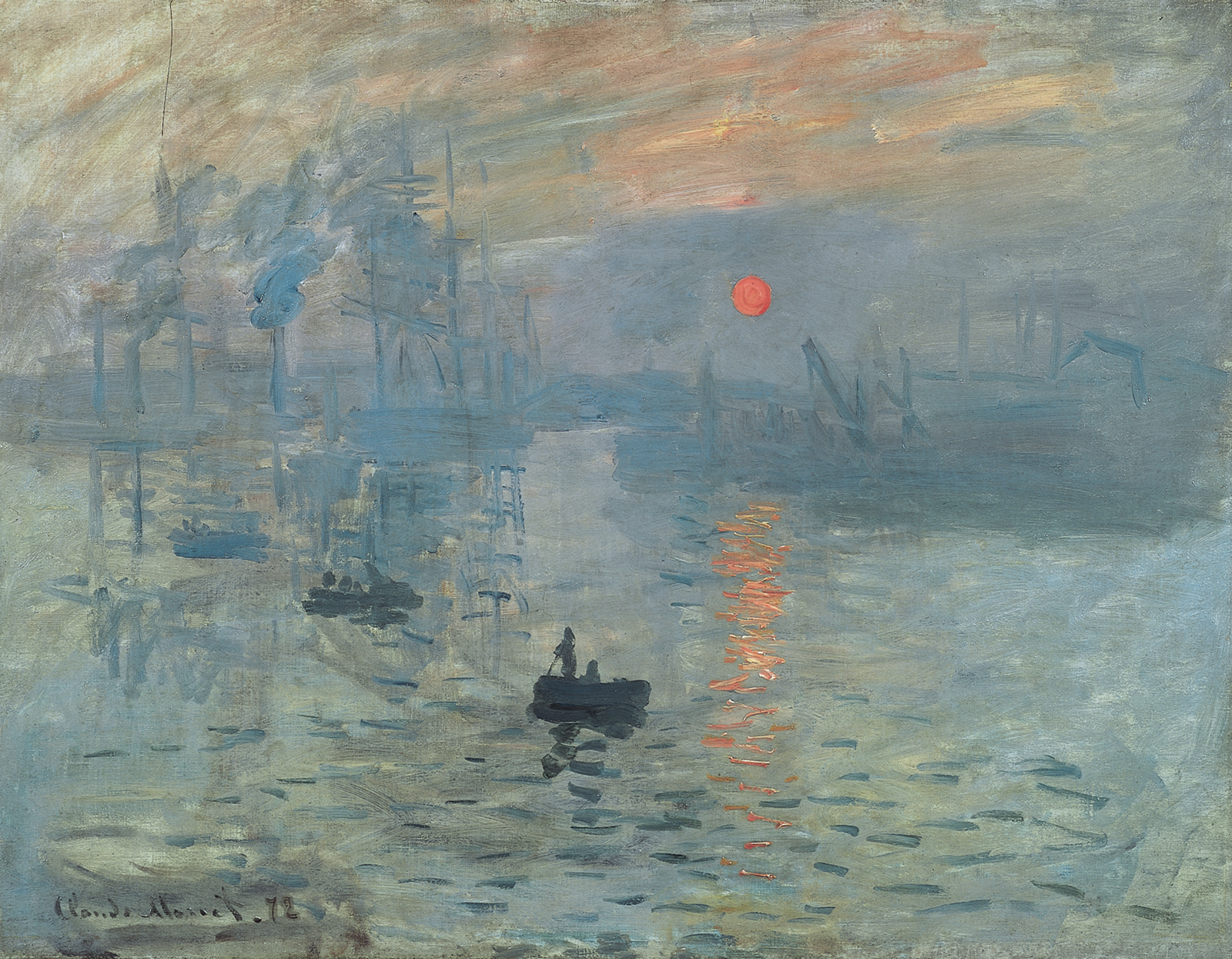
Impression, Sunrise; by Claude Monet; 1872; oil on canvas; 48.1 x 62.8 cm; Musée Marmottan Monet (Paris)

Impressionism emerged in France, under the influences of Realism, the Barbizon School, and en plein air painters like Eugène Boudin, Camille Corot, Charles-Francois Daubigny, and Johan Barthold Jongkind. Starting in the late 1850s, several of the impressionists had made acquaintances and friendships as students in Paris, notably at the free Académie Suisse and Charles Gleyre's studio. Their progressive work was frequently rejected by the conservative juries of the prestigious Académie des Beaux Arts salons, a forum where many artist turned to establish their reputations, and many of the young artist were included in a highly publicized, but much ridiculed Salon des Refusés in 1863. In 1874 they formed the Société Anonyme Coopérative des Artistes Peintres, Sculpteurs, Graveurs, independent of the academy, and mounted the first of several impressionist exhibitions in Paris, through to 1886 when their eighth and final exhibition was held. Important figures in the movement included Frédéric Bazille, Gustave Caillebotte, Mary Cassatt, Paul Cézanne, Edgar Degas, Armand Guillaumin, Édouard Manet, Claude Monet, Berthe Morisot, Camille Pissarro, Pierre-Auguste Renoir, and Alfred Sisley. Although impressionism was primarily a movement of painters, Degas and Renoir also produced sculptures and others like Auguste Rodin and Medardo Rosso are sometimes linked to impressionism. By 1885 impressionism had achieved some prominence, and yet a younger generation were already pushing the limits beyond impressionism. Artist from Russia, Australia, America and Latin America soon adopted impressionist styles. A few of the original impressionist continued producing significant work into the 1910s and 1920s.

Although not unprecedented, many of the techniques used were in contrast to traditional methods. Paintings were often completed in hours or days with wet paint applied to wet paint (opposed to wet on dry paint, completed in weeks and months). Rather than applying glazes and mixed colors, pure colors were often applied side by side, in thick, opaque, impasto strokes; blending in the eye of the viewer when observed from a distance. Black was used very sparingly, or not at all, and defining lines replaced with nuanced strokes of color forming the subjects, contours, and shapes. Art historian H. W. Janson said "instead of adding to the illusion of real space, it strengthens the unity of the actual painted surface." Impressionist paintings typically depict landscapes, portraits, still lifes, domestic scenes, daily leisure and nightlife, all treated in a realist manner. Compositions were often based on unusual perspectives, appearing spontaneous and candid. The paintings were usually void of didactic, symbolic, or metaphoric meanings, and rarely addressed the biblical, mythological, and historical subjects that were so highly regarded by the academies or the darker and psychological interest explored by the symbolist. The nuances of light, shadow, atmosphere, and reflections of colors from surfaces were examined, sometimes emphasizing changes of these elements in time. The painting itself was the subject of the painting. It was art for art's sake, an idea that had been floating around for a few of decades but it perhaps reached a new high and consistency in impressionism.

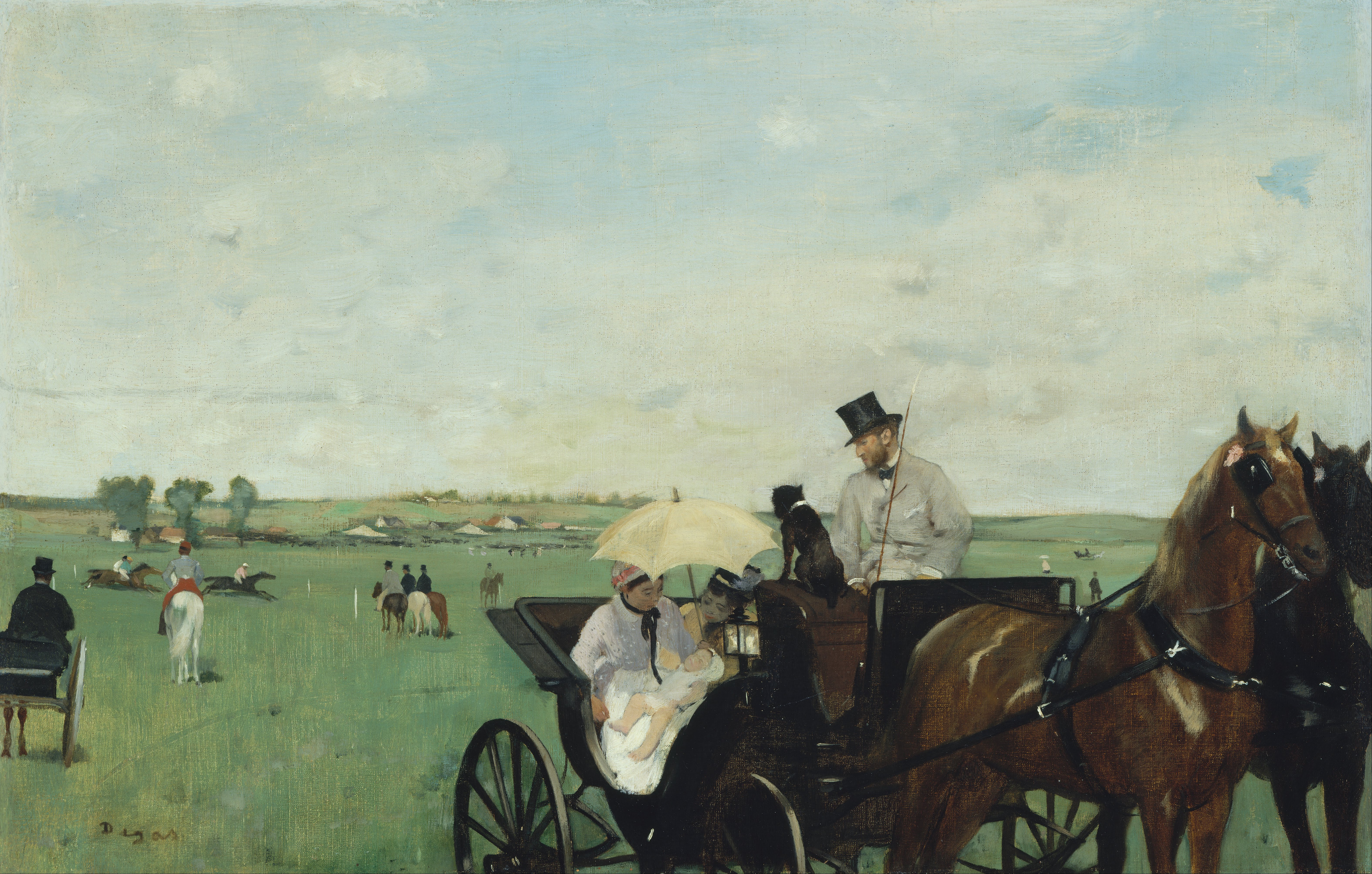
At the Races in the Countryside; by Edgar Degas; 1869; oil on canvas; 36.5 x 56 cm; Museum of Fine Arts (Boston, US)

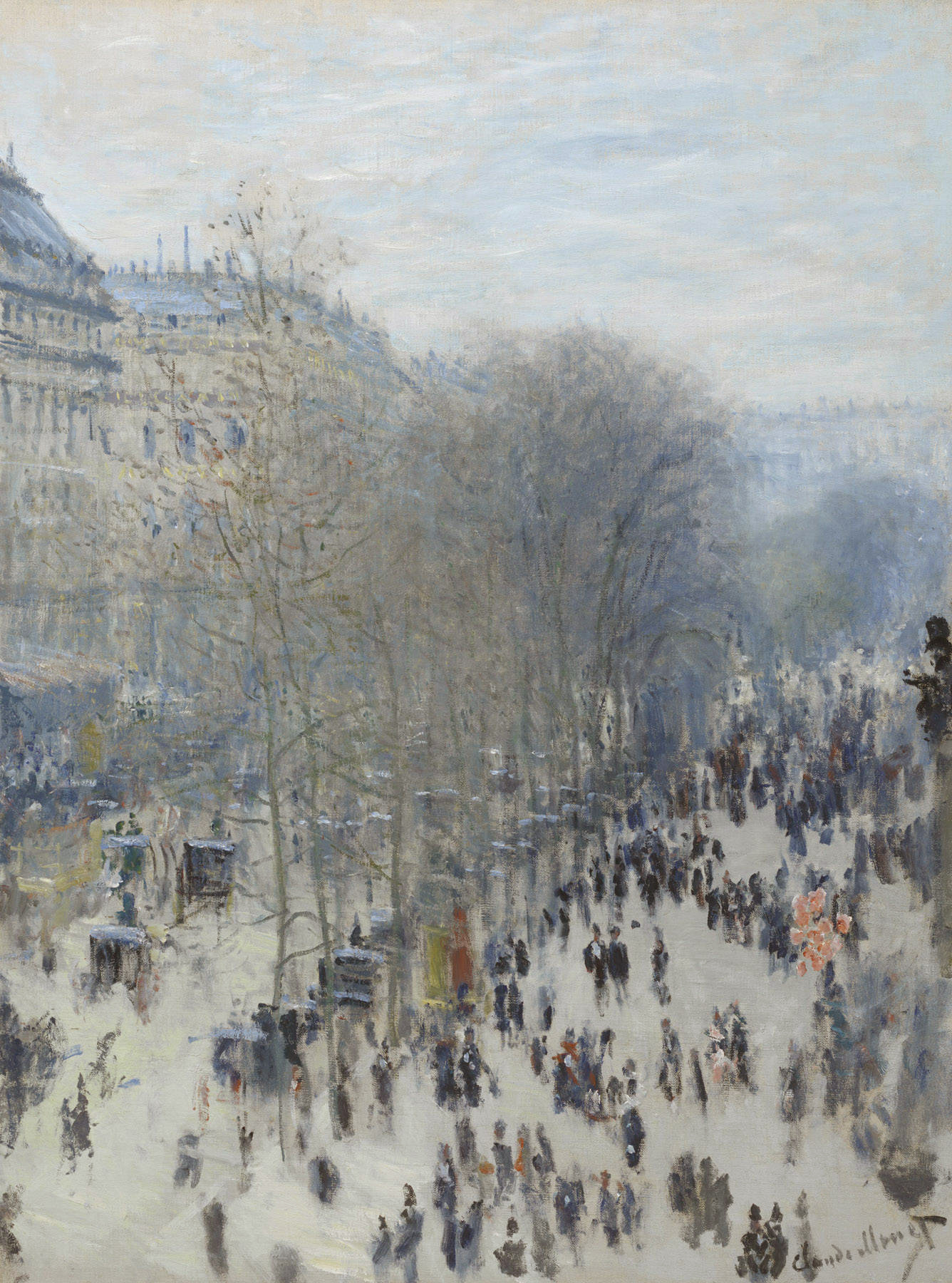
Boulevard des Capucines; by Claude Monet; 1873; oil on canvas; 80.5 x 60.2 cm; Nelson-Atkins Museum of Art (Kansas City, Missouri, US)

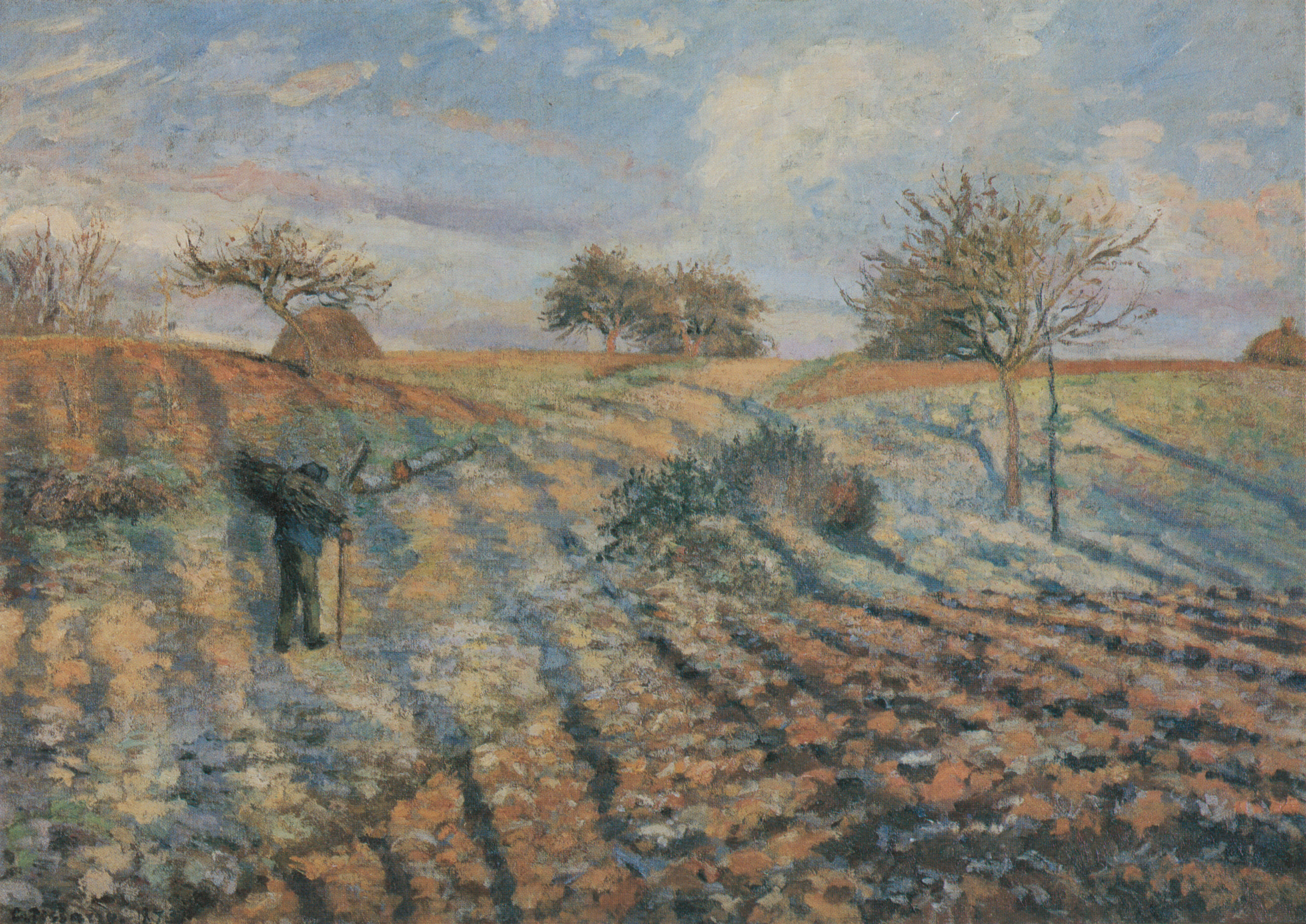
Hoarfrost: Old Road to Ennery, Pontoise; by Camille Pissarro; 1873; oil on canvas; 64.7 x 92.6 cm; Musée d'Orsay (Paris)

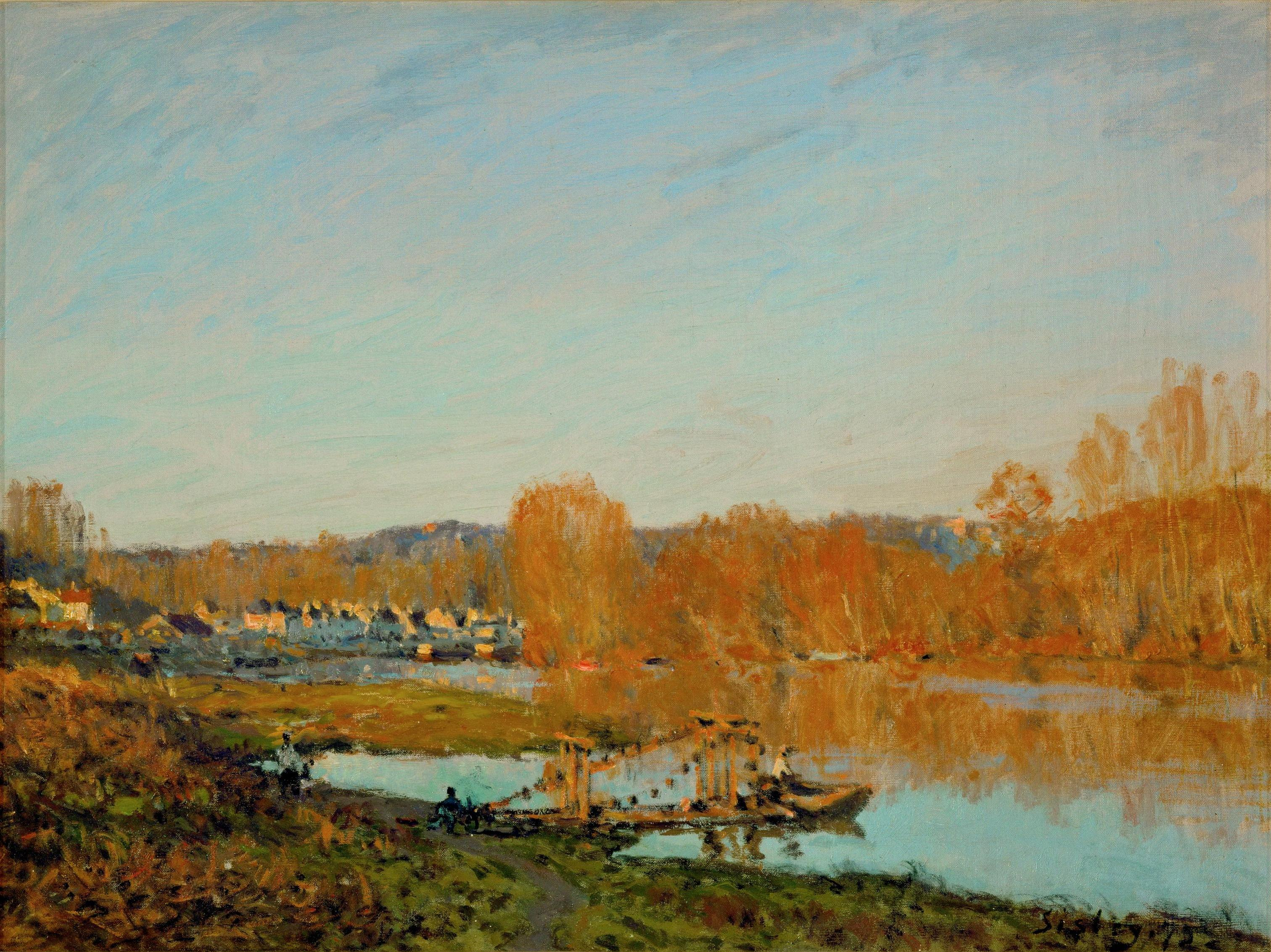
Banks of the Seine near Bougival; by Alfred Sisley; 1873; oil on canvas; 46.2 x 62.1 cm; Montreal Museum of Fine Arts (Montreal, Canada)

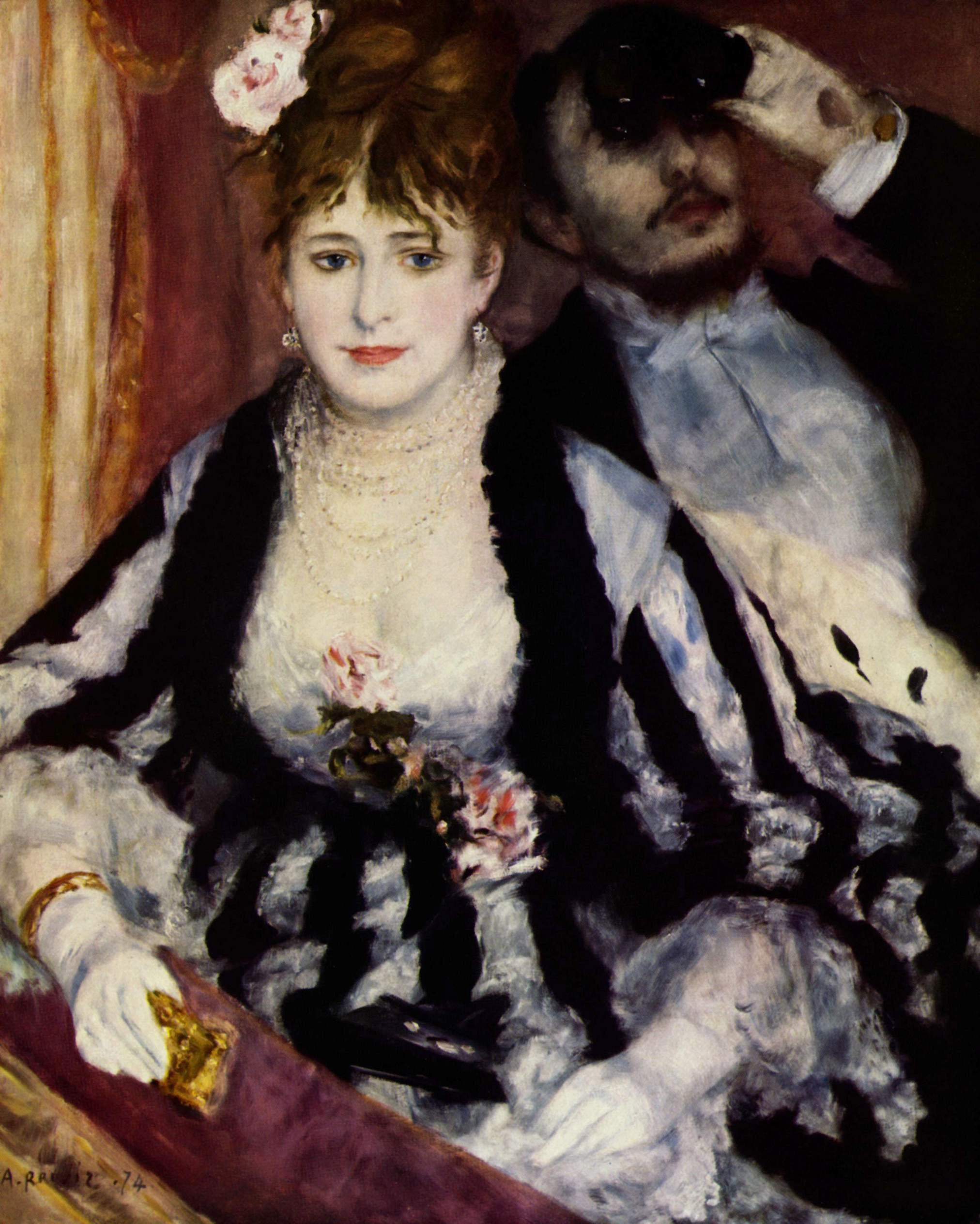
La Loge; Pierre-Auguste Renoir; 1874; oil on canvas; 80 x 63.4 cm; Courtauld Gallery (London)

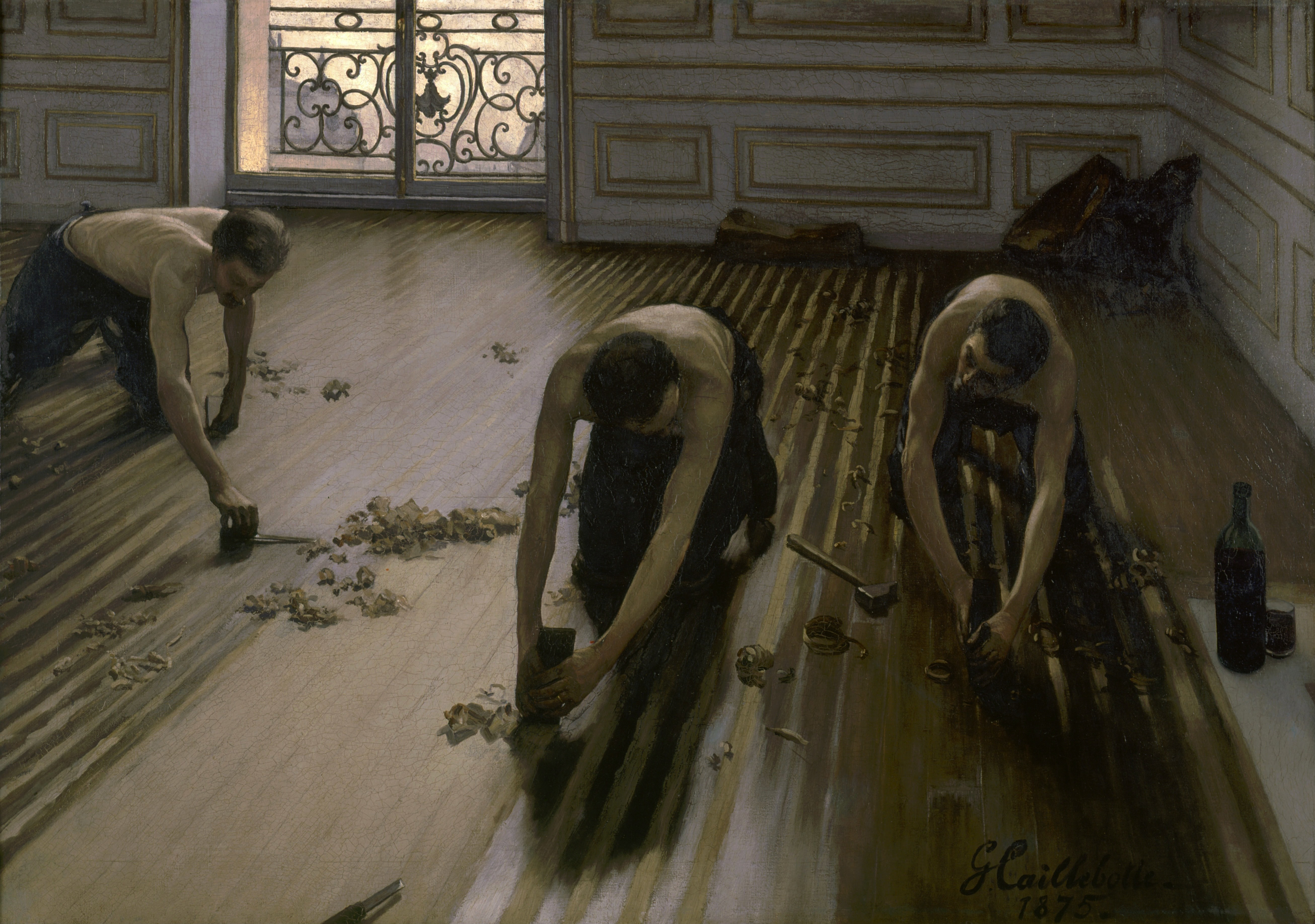
The Floor Scrapers; by Gustave Caillebotte; 1875; oil on canvas; 1 x 1.54 m; Musée d'Orsay

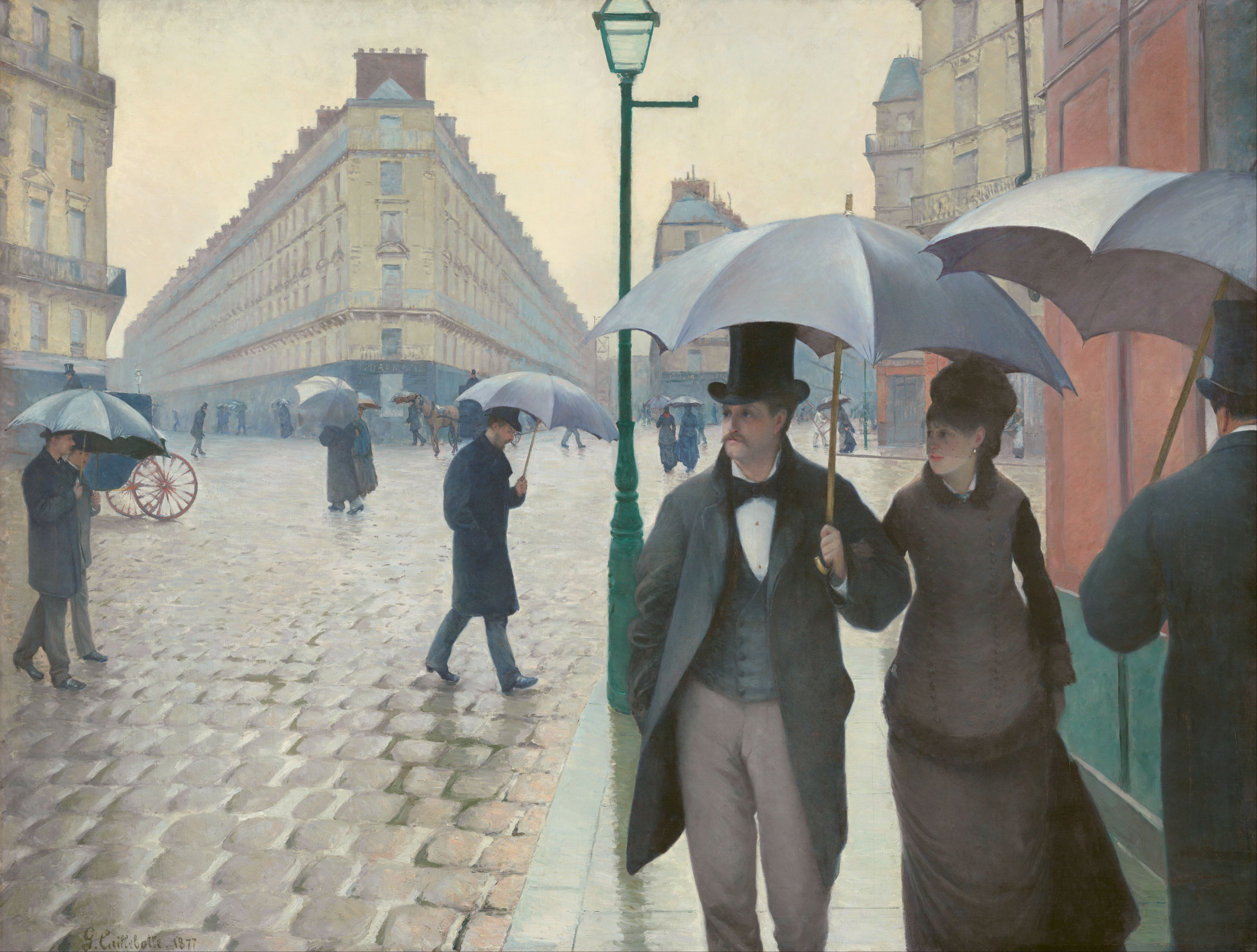
Paris Street; Rainy Day; by Gustave Caillebotte; 1877; oil on canvas; 212.2 × 276.2 cm; Art Institute of Chicago

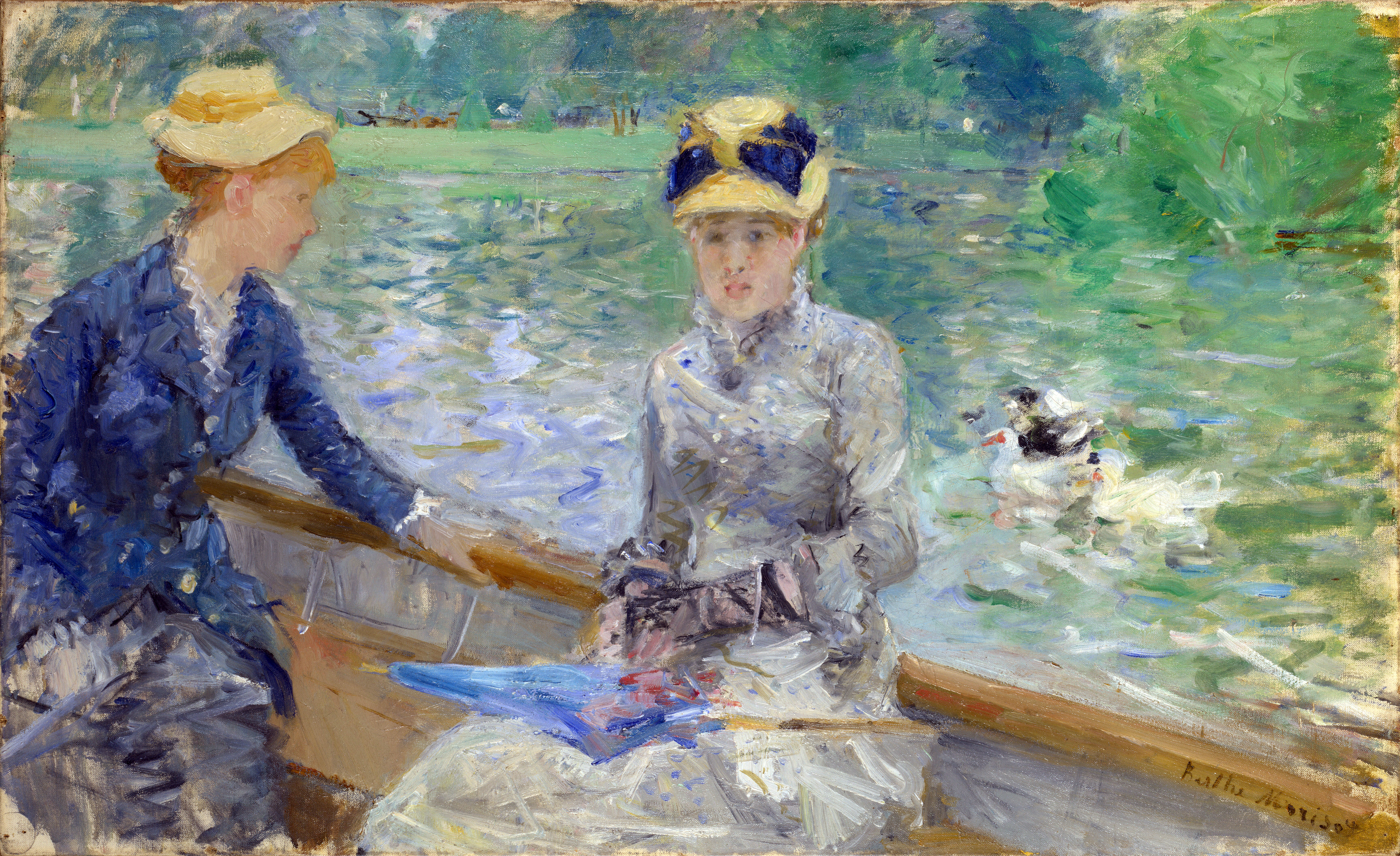
Summer's Day; by Berthe Morisot; 1879; oil on canvas; 45.7 cm × 75.2 cm; National Portrait Gallery (London)

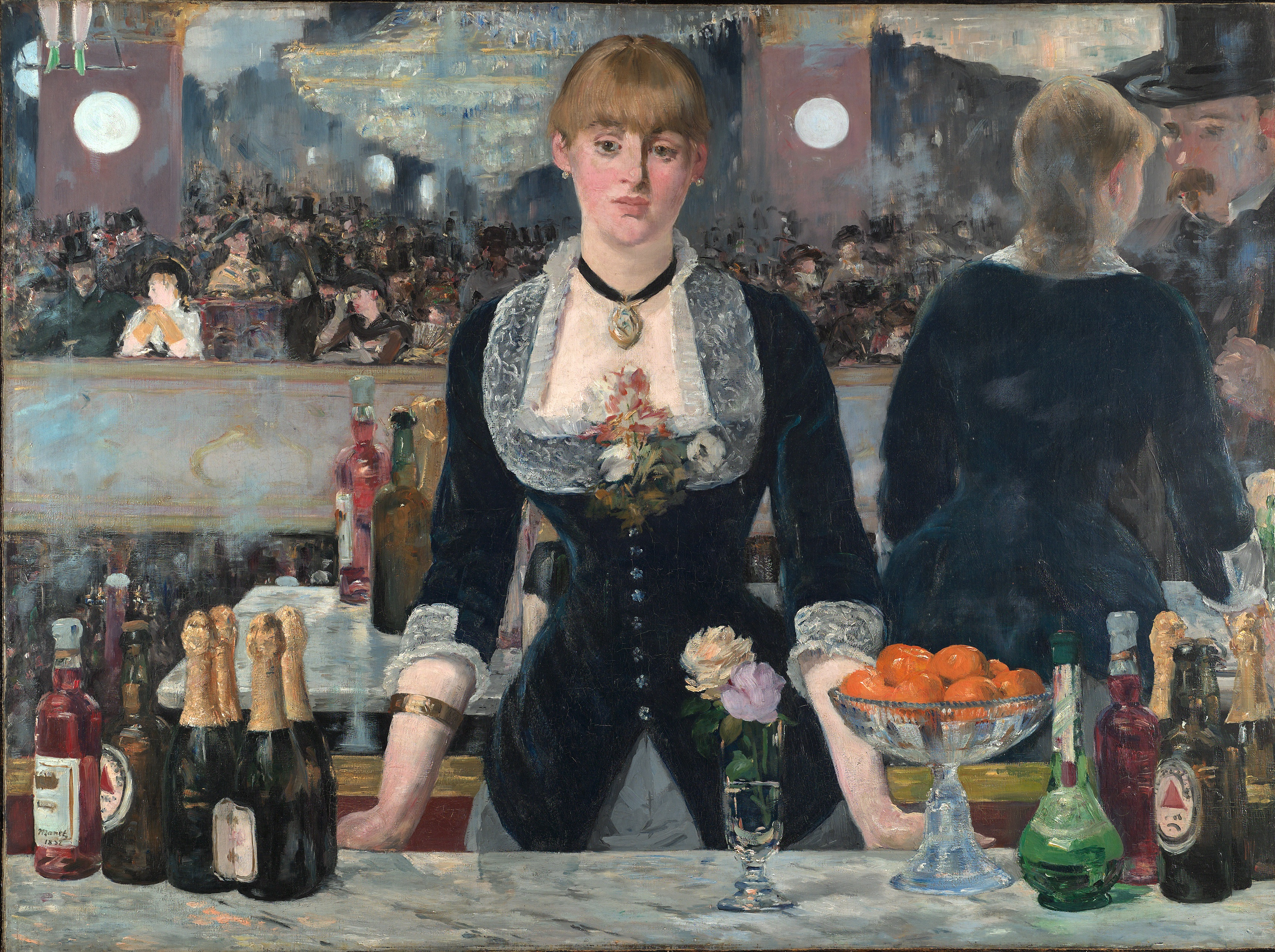
A Bar at the Folies-Bergère; by Édouard Manet; 1881–1882; oil on canvas; 96 × 130 cm.; Courtauld Institute of Art (London)

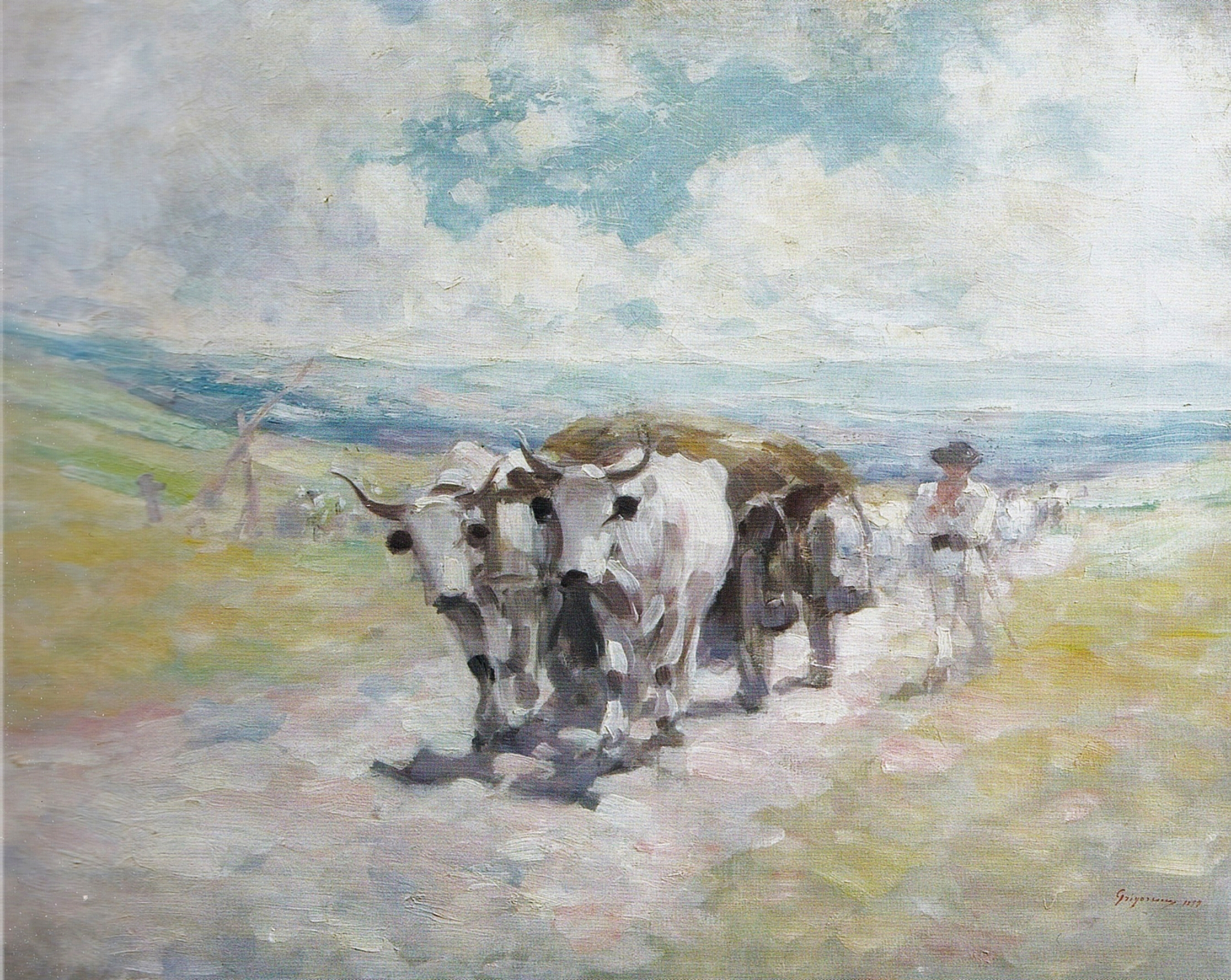
Ox-Drawn Cart; by Nicolae Grigorescu; 1899; oil on canvas; 66 x 81 cm; National Museum of Art of Romania (Bucharest, Romania)

==== Symbolism (c. 1860–1915) ====
Symbolism emerged in France and Belgium in the 3rd quarter of the nineteenth century and spread throughout Europe in the 1870s, and later to America to a lesser extent. It evolved from romanticism without a clear or defining demarcation point, although poetry, literature, and specifically the publication of Charles Baudelaire's Les Fleurs du mal (The Flowers of Evil) in 1857 were significant in the development of symbolism. It had international expression in poetry, literature, drama, and music. In architecture, the applied arts, and decorative arts symbolism closely paralleled and overlapped into Art Nouveau. Symbolism is often inextricably linked to other contemporary art movements, surfacing and finding expression within other styles like Post-Impressionism, Les Nabis, the Decadent Movement, the Fin-de Siecle, Art Nouveau, The Munich Secession, The Vienna Secession, Expressionism, and even the Pre-Raphaelites, which had formed before and influenced symbolism as well. Artist as diverse as James McNeill Whistler, Eugène Carrière, Ferdinand Hodler, Fernand Khnopff, Giovanni Segantini, Lucien Lévy-Dhurmer, Jean Delville, and James Ensor all had varying degrees of association with symbolism. Art historian Robert L. Delevoy wrote "Symbolism was less a school than the atmosphere of a period." It quickly began to fade with the onset of Fauvism, Cubism, Futurism and had largely dissipated by the outbreak of the First World War, however it did find some sustained development and relevance in the metaphysical school, which in turn had a profound influence on surrealism.

The subjects, themes, and meanings of symbolist art are frequently veiled and obscure, but at its best still manage to resonate deeply on psychological or emotional levels. The subjects are often presented as metaphors or allegories, aiming to evoke highly subjective, personal, introspective emotions and ideas in the viewer, without clearly defining or addressing the subject directly. The poet Stéphane Mallarmé wrote "depict not the thing but the effect it produces" and "To name an object is to suppress three quarters of the pleasure of the poem which is made to be understood little by little". The English painter George Frederic Watts stated "I paint ideas, not things."

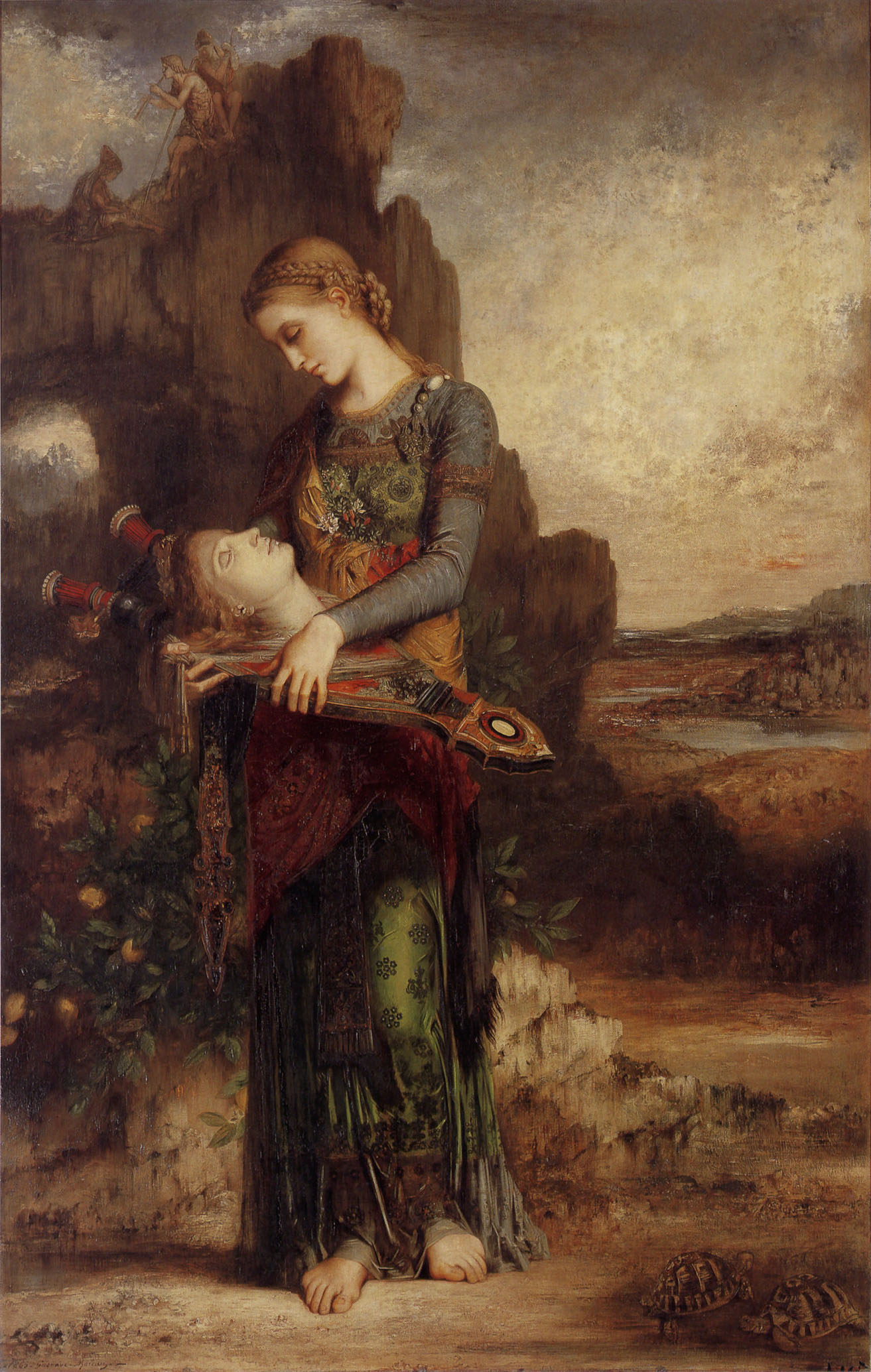
Thracian Girl with Head of Orpheus on his Lyre; by Gustave Moreau; 1865; oil; 154 × 99.5 cm; Musée d'Orsay (Paris)

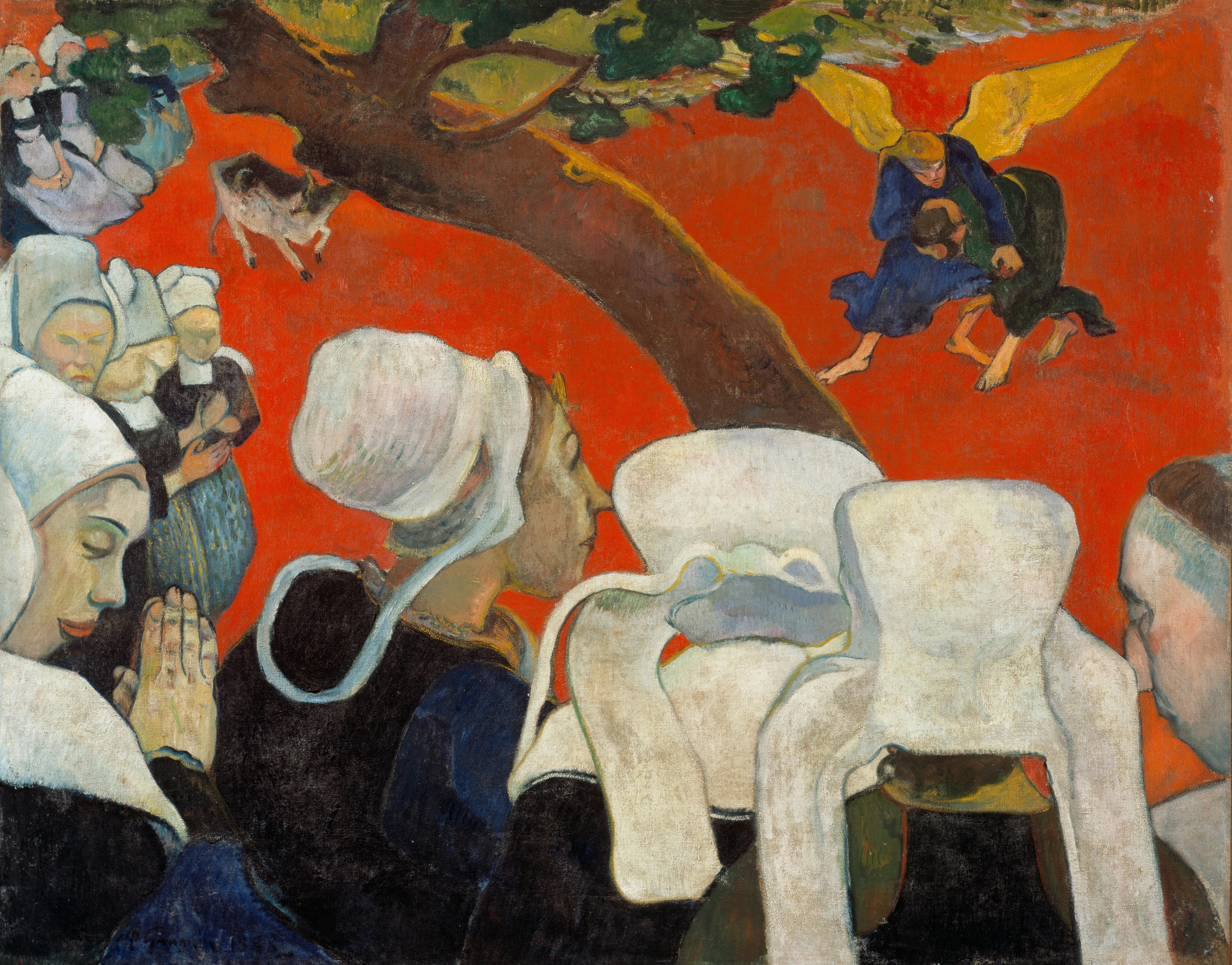
Vision After the Sermon (Jacob Wrestling with the Angel); 1888; oil on canvas; 73 x 92 cm; Scottish National Gallery (Edinburgh, Scotland)

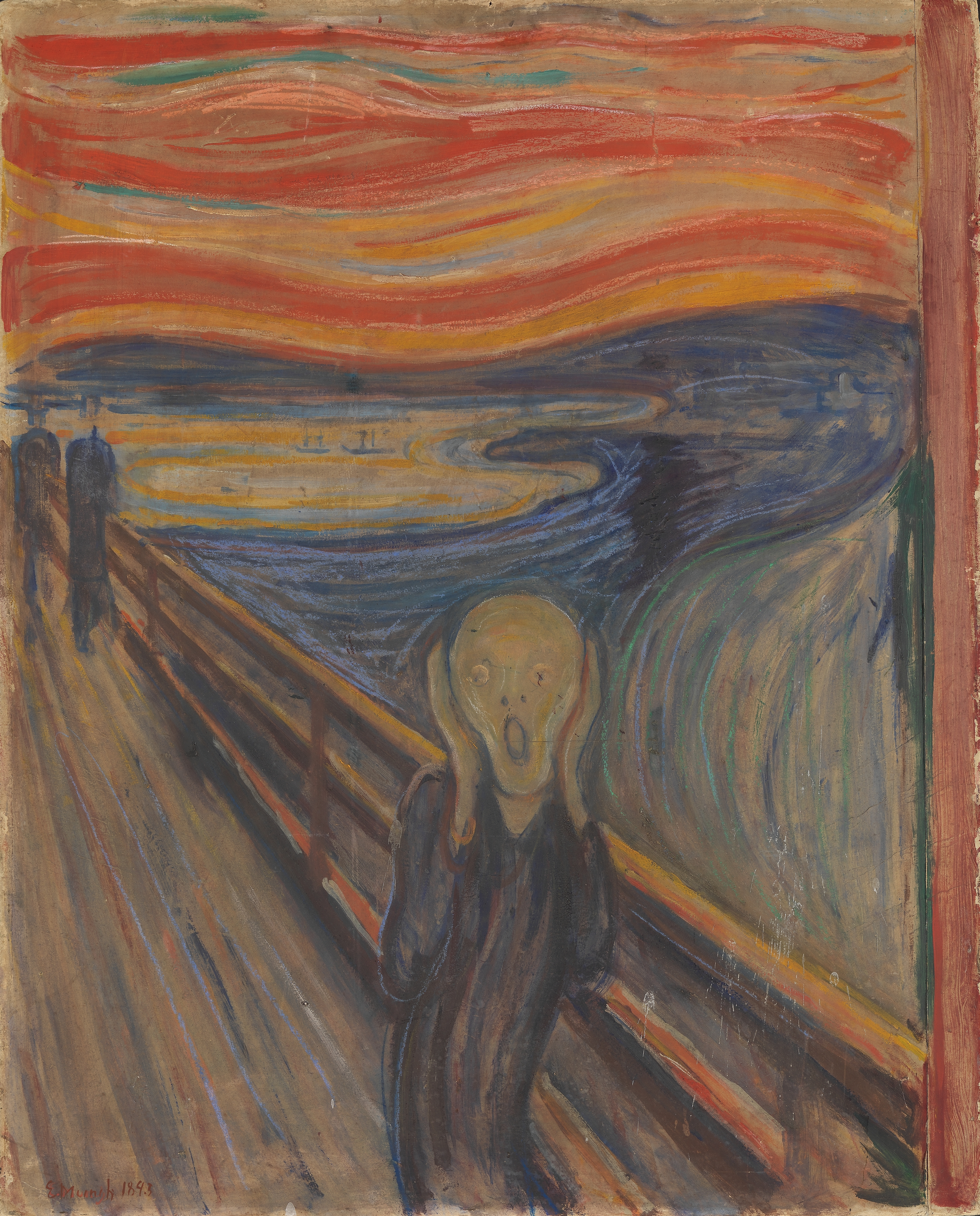
The Scream; by Edvard Munch; 1893; tempera and crayon on cardboard; 91 x 73.5 cm; National Gallery (Oslo, Norway)

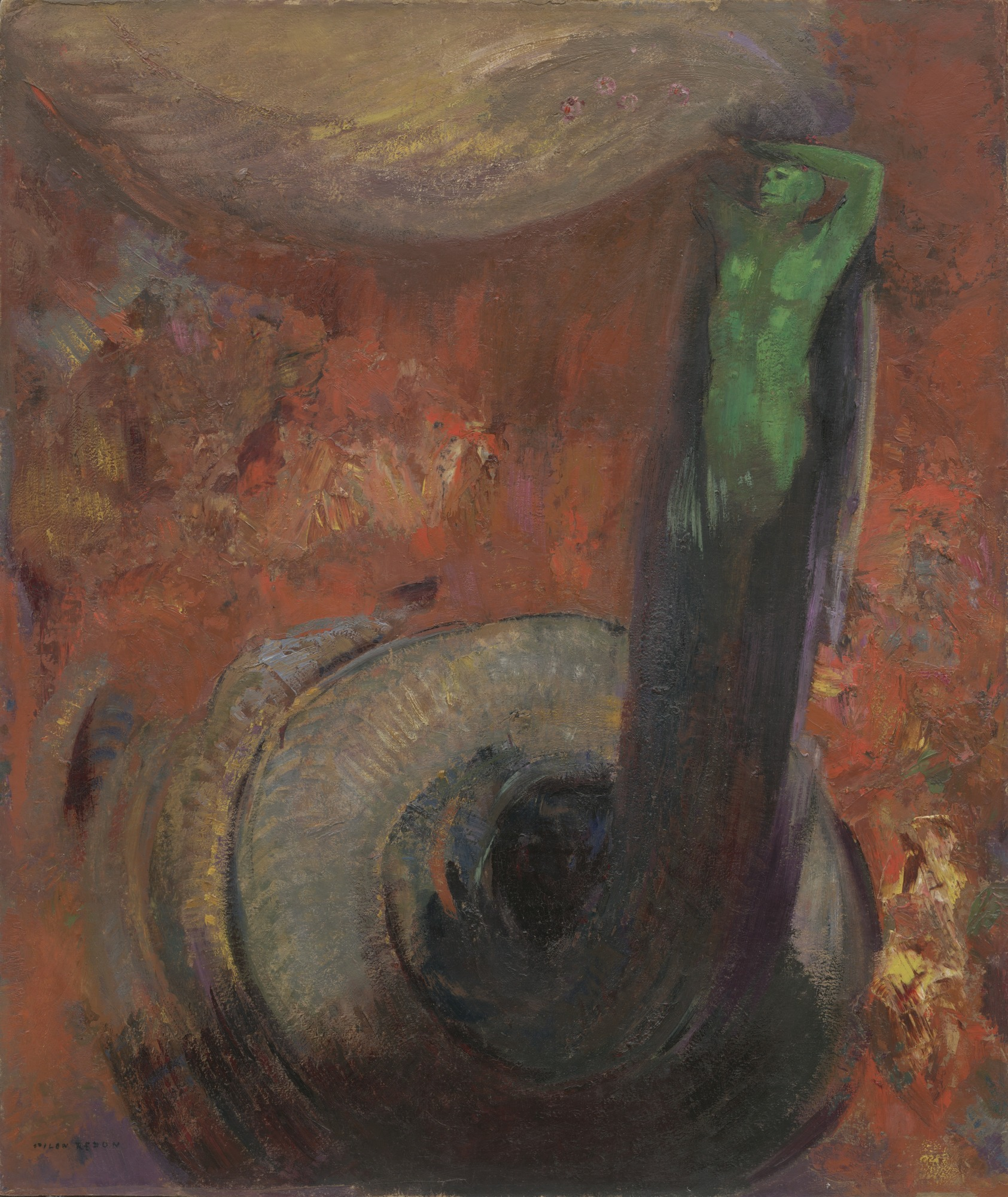
Green Death; by Odilon Redon; c.1905; oil on canvas; 54.9 x 46.3 cm; Museum of Modern Art

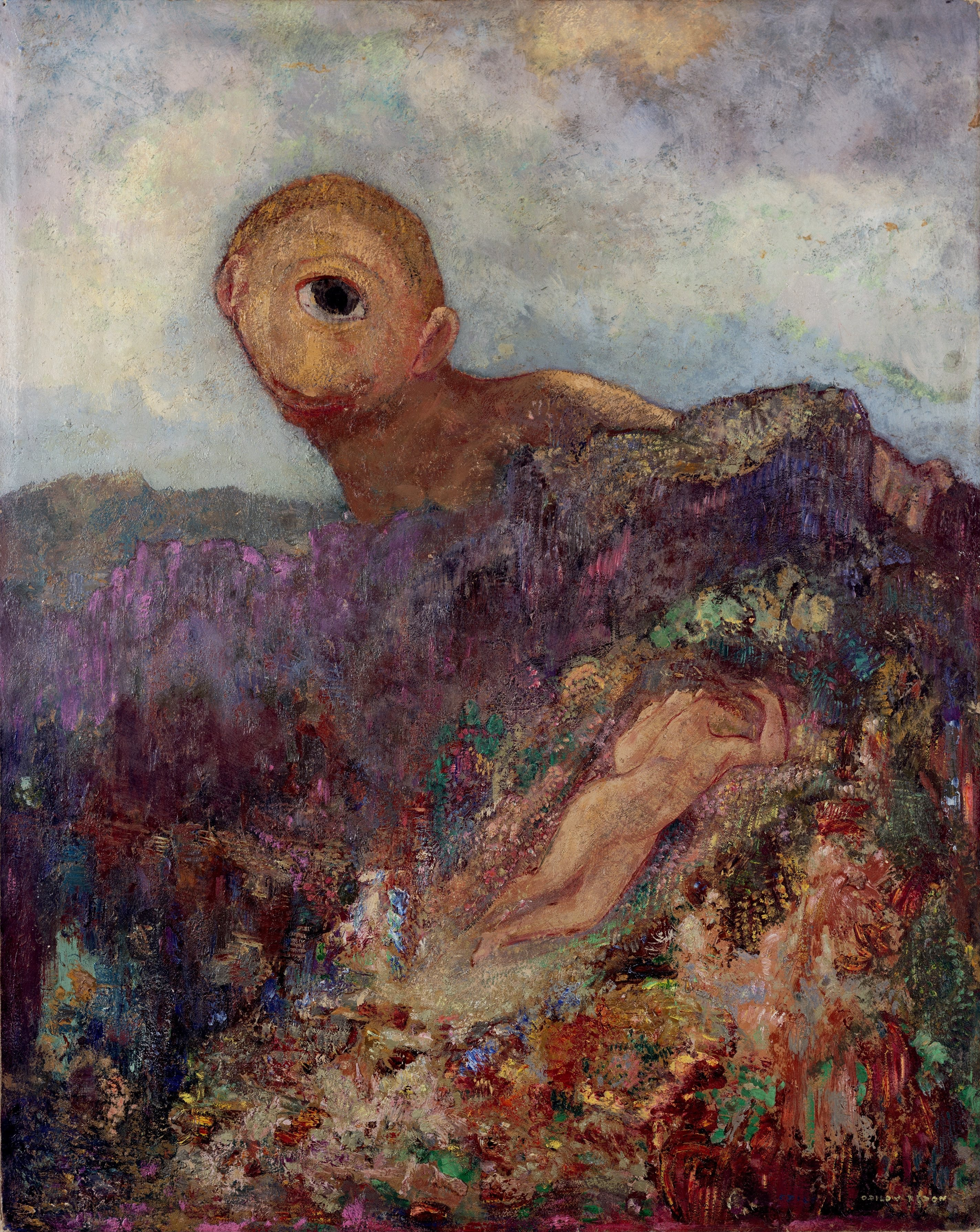
The Cyclops; by Odilon Redon; c.1914; oil on cardboard on panel; 64 x 51 cm; Kröller-Müller Museum (Otterlo, the Netherlands)

==== Post-Impressionism (c. 1885–1910) ====
A Sunday Afternoon on the Island of La Grande Jatte; by Georges Seurat; 1884–1886; oil on canvas; 2.08 x 3.08 m; Art Institute of Chicago

Post-Impressionism is a rather imprecise term applied to a diverse generation of artists. In its strictest sense, it pertains to four highly influential artists: Paul Cézanne, Paul Gauguin, Georges Seurat, and Vincent van Gogh. Each passed through an impressionist phase, but ultimately emerged with four very original but different styles. Collectively, their work anticipated, and often directly influenced, much of the avant-garde art that appeared before the First World War including fauvism, cubism, expressionism, and early abstraction. Cézanne (particularly influential on cubism) and Van Gogh worked in relative isolation, away from Paris, at critical points in their careers, while Seurat and Gauguin worked in groups, more collaboratively, at key points in their development. Another important artist of the period is Toulouse-Lautrec, an influential painter as well as graphic artist. In a broader sense, post-impressionism includes a generation of predominantly French and Belgian artists who worked in a range of styles and groups. Most had come under the sway of impressionism at some point, but pushed their work beyond it into a number of factions as early as the mid-1880s, sometimes as a logical development of impressionism, other times as a reaction against it. Post-Impressionists typically depicted impressionist subjects, but the work, particularly synthetism, often contained symbolism, spiritualism, and moody atmospheres that rarely appeared in impressionism. Unnatural colors, patterns, flat plains, odd perspectives and viewpoints pushed to extremes, all moved the center of modernism a step closer to abstraction with a standard for experimentation.

Neo-Impressionism (Divisionism or Pointillism, c. 1884–1894) explored light and color based on scientific color theories, creating mosaics of brush strokes in pure colors, sometimes laid out in rhythmic patterns with lines influenced by Art Nouveau. The leading artists were Georges Seurat and Paul Signac, others include Henri-Edmond Cross, Maximilien Luce, Albert Dubois-Pillet, and for a period Pissarro and Van Gogh. It was influential on fauvism, and elements of the style appeared in expressionism, cubism, and early abstraction. Synthetism (Cloisonnism c. 1888–1903) Cloisonnism was conceived by Émile Bernard and immediately taken up and developed by Paul Gauguin and others while at an artists' colony in Pont-Aven (Brittany, France). The style resembled cloisonné enamel or stained glass, with flat, bold colors outlined in black or dark colors. Synthetism, exemplified in the work of Gauguin and Paul Sérusier, is slightly a broader term with less emphasis on dark outlines and cloisonné qualities. Other artist include Cuno Amiet, Louis Anquetin, Charles Filiger, Jacob Meyer de Haan, Charles Laval, and Armand Seguin. Their work greatly influenced fauvism and expressionism. Les Nabis (c. 1890–1905: Hebrew for prophets or illuminati) was a larger movement in France and Belgium that eclectically drew on progressive elements in synthetism, neo-impressionism, symbolism, and Art Nouveau. Perhaps more influential than the art, were the numerous theories, manifestoes, and infectious enthusiasm for the avant-garde, setting the tone for the proliferation of movements and "isms" in the first quarter of the 20th century. La Revue Blanche often published Les Nabis and symbolist content. The work of Édouard Vuillard, and Pierre Bonnard, ca. 1890–1910 is exemplary of Les Nabis, though both evolved in their styles and produced significant work into the 1940s. Other artist include Maurice Denis, Maxime Dethomas, Meyer de Haan, Henri-Gabriel Ibels, Georges Lacombe, Aristide Maillol, Paul Ranson, Ker-Xavier Roussel, Armand Séguin, Paul Sérusier, Félix Vallotton, Jan Verkade, and others.

The Starry Night; by Vincent van Gogh; 1889; oil on canvas; height: 73.7 cm; Museum of Modern Art (New York City)

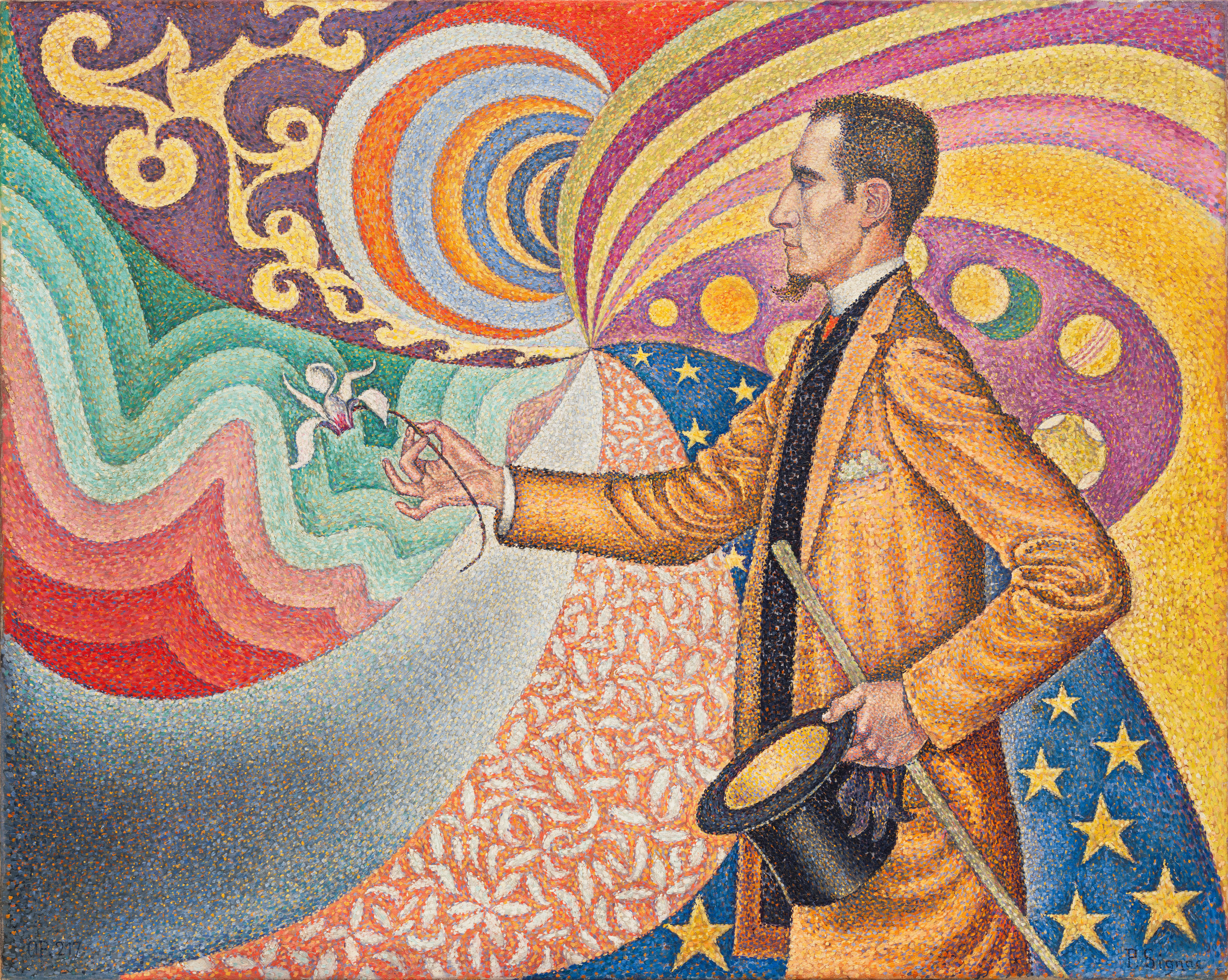
Félix Fénéon; by Paul Signac; 1890; oil on canvas; 73.5 x 92.5 cm; Museum of Modern Art (New York City)

Aha Oe Feii? (Are You Jealous?); by Paul Gauguin; 1892; oil on canvas; 68 x 92 cm; Pushkin Museum (Moscow, Russia)

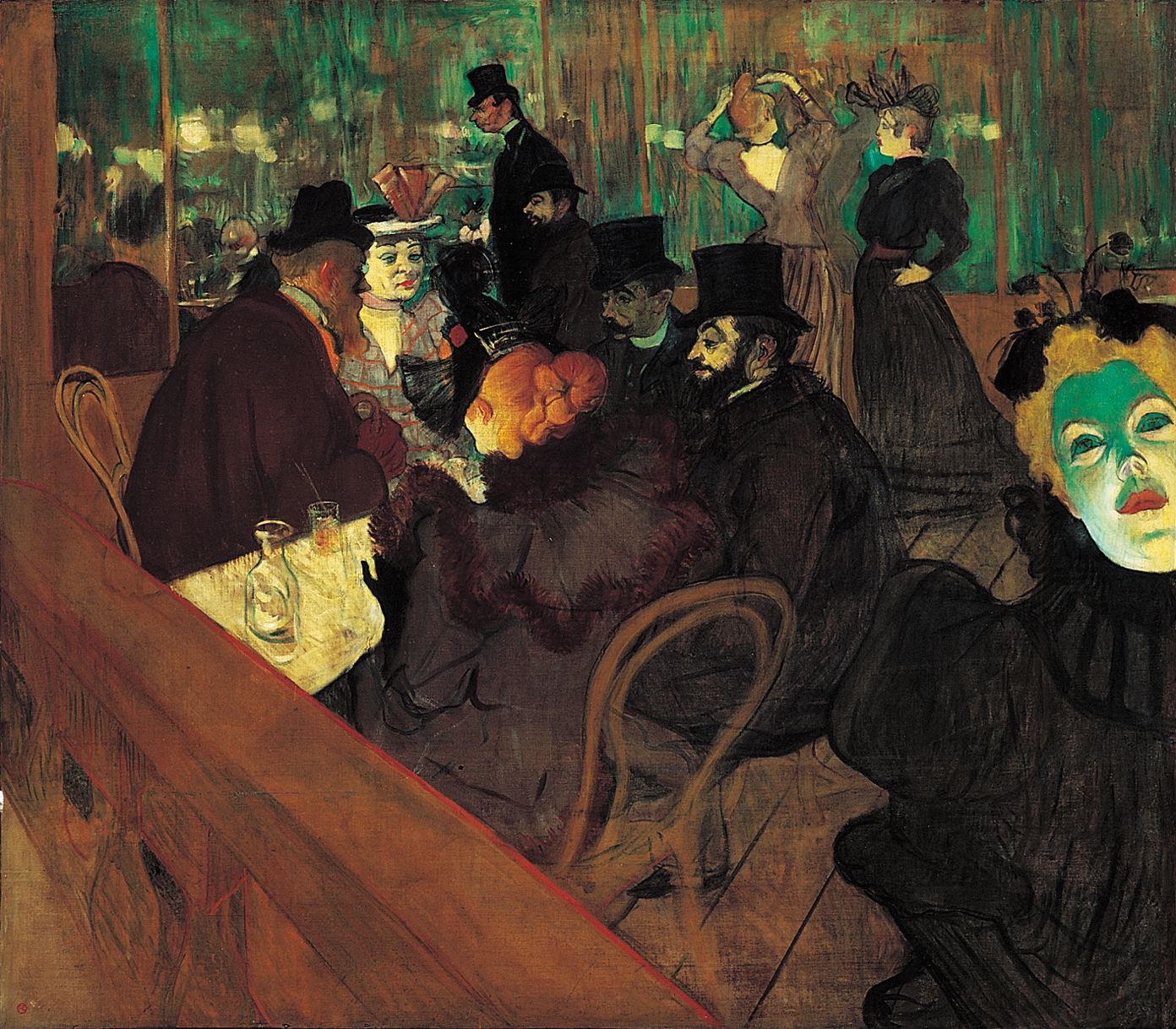
At the Moulin Rouge; by Henri de Toulouse-Lautrec; 1892/1895; oil on canvas, 1.23 × 1.41 m; Art Institute of Chicago

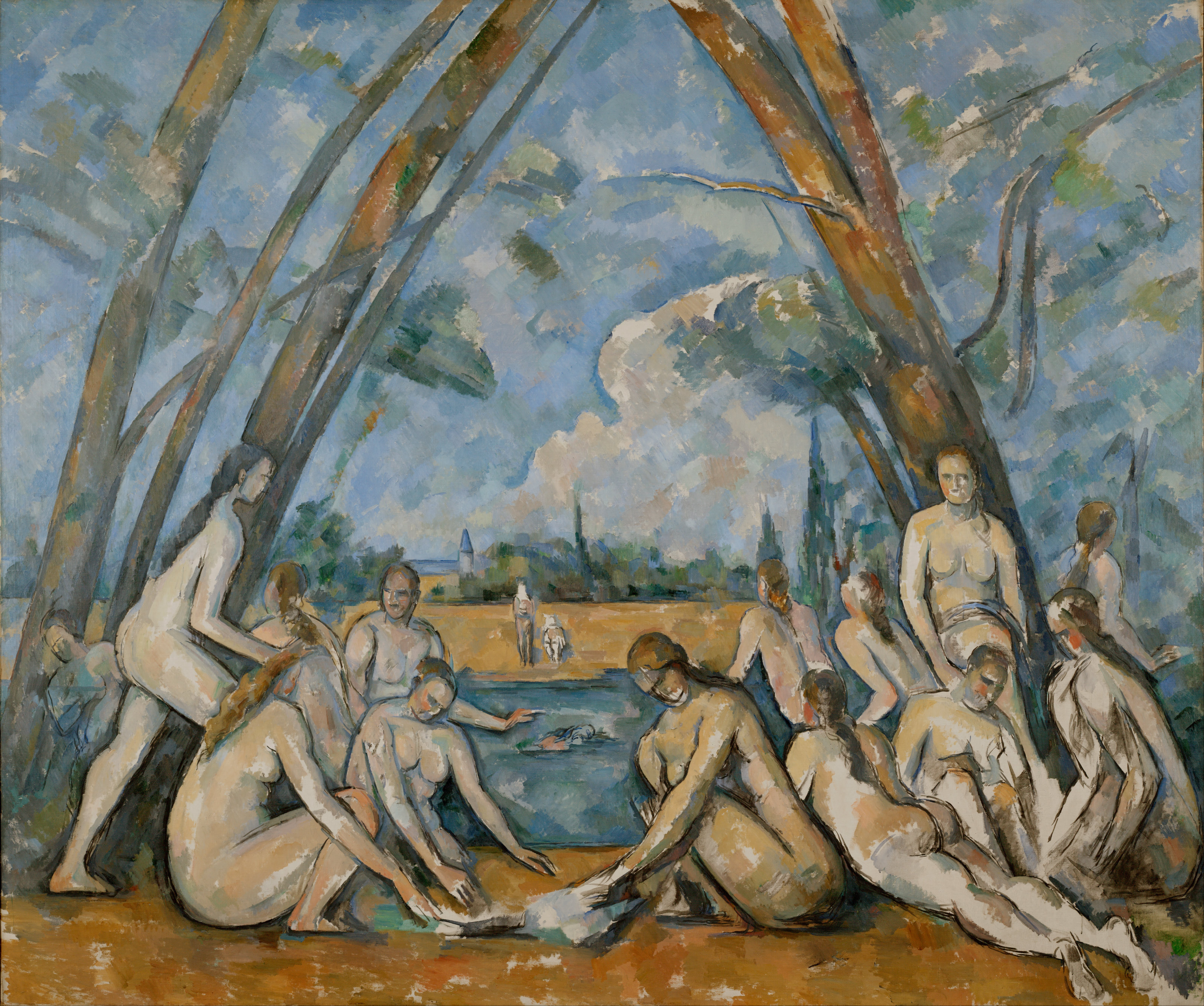
The Bathers; by Paul Cézanne; 1898–1905; oil on canvas; 210.5 cm × 250.8 cm; Philadelphia Museum of Art (Philadelphia, US)

=== Early 20th century ===
The history of 20th-century art is a narrative of endless possibilities and the search for new standards, each being torn down in succession by the next. The art movements of Fauvism, Expressionism, Cubism, abstract art, Dadaism and Surrealism led to further explorations of new creative styles and manners of expression. Increasing global interaction during this time saw an equivalent influence of other cultures into Western art, such as Pablo Picasso being influenced by Iberian sculpture, African sculpture and Primitivism. Japonism, and Japanese woodcuts (which had themselves been influenced by Western Renaissance draftsmanship) had an immense influence on Impressionism and subsequent artistic developments. The influential example set by Paul Gauguin's interest in Oceanic art and the sudden popularity among the cognoscenti in early 20th century Paris of newly discovered African fetish sculptures and other works from non-European cultures were taken up by Picasso, Henri Matisse, and many of their colleagues. Later in the 20th century, Pop Art and Abstract Expressionism came to prominence.

==== Art Nouveau (c. 1890–1914) ====
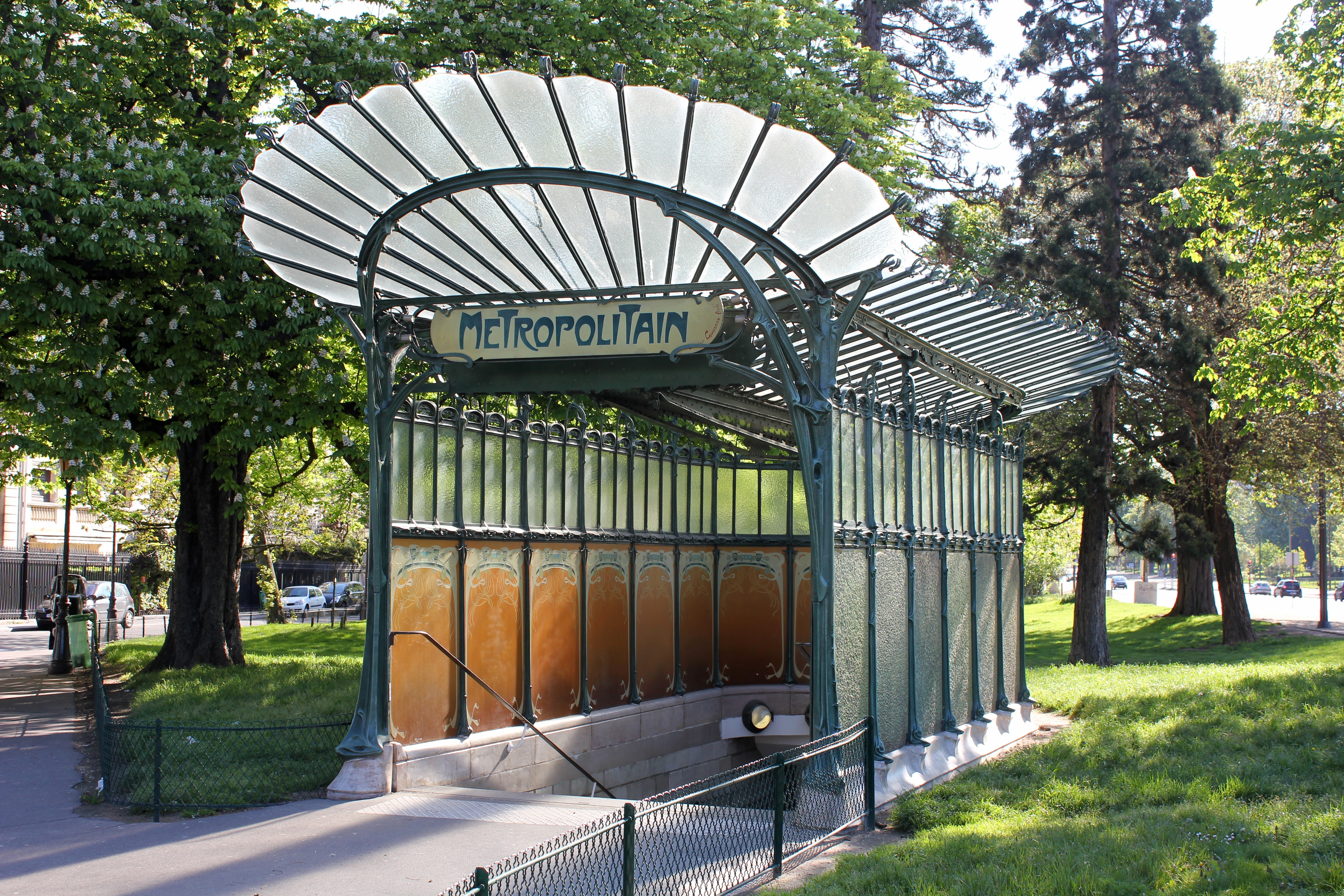
Porte Dauphine Métro Station (Paris), by Hector Guimard, 1900

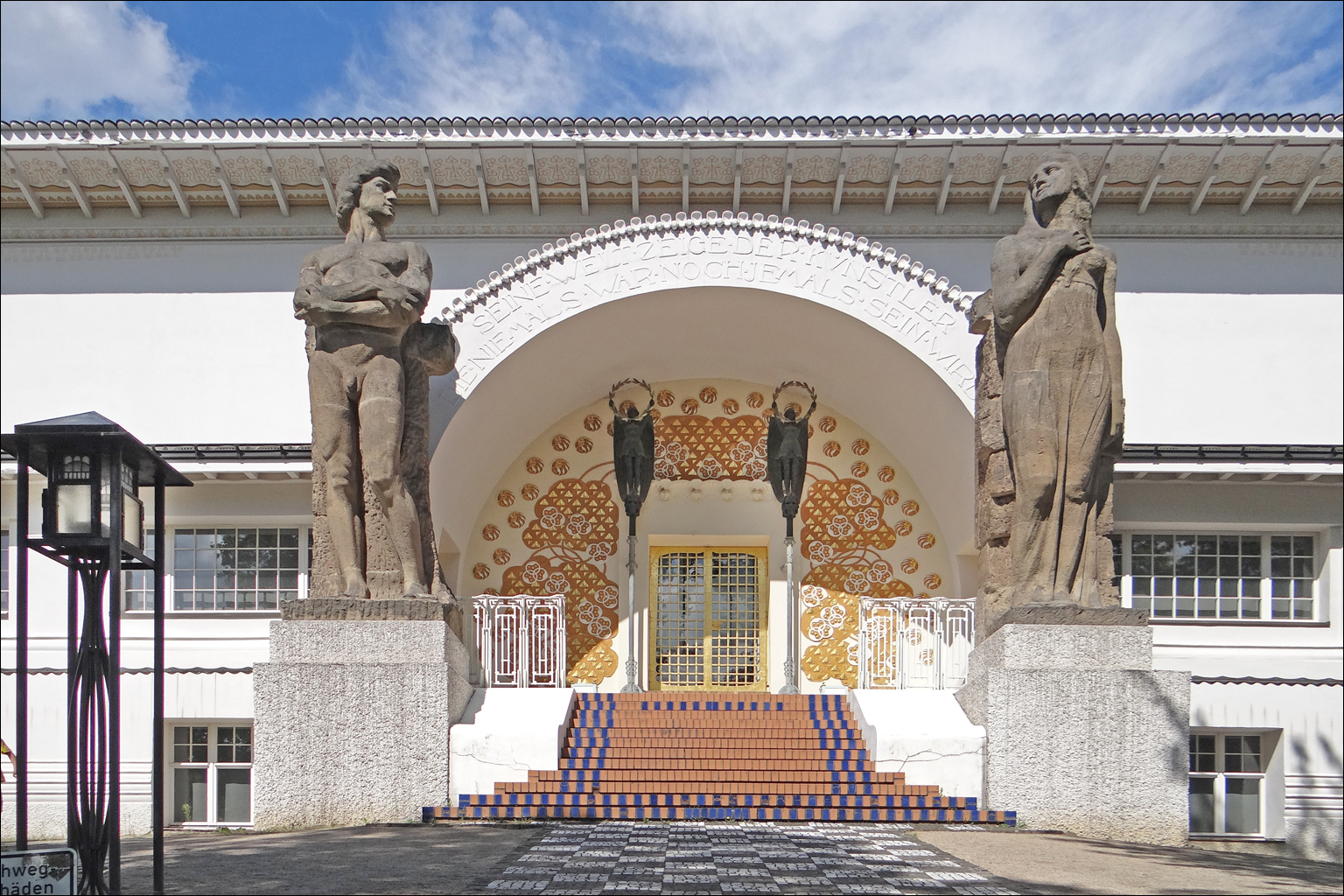
Ernst Ludwig House in Darmstadt Artists' Colony, Darmstadt, Germany, by Joseph Maria Olbrich (1900)

Art Nouveau (French: new art) was an international and widespread art and design movement that emerged in the final decades of the 19th century until the First World War in 1914. It was catapulted into international prominence with the 1900 Exposition Universelle in Paris. Developing almost simultaneously in parts of Europe and the US, it was an attempt to create a unique and modern form of expression that evoked the spirit of the new century. It manifested in painting, illustration, sculpture, jewellery, metalwork, glass, ceramics, textiles, graphic design, furniture, architecture, costume design and fashion. Art Nouveau artists aimed to raise the status of craft and design to the level of fine art.

The movement is highly associated with sinuous organic forms, such as flowers, vines and leaves, but also insects and animals, through the works of artists like Alphonse Mucha, Victor Horta, Hector Guimard, Antoni Gaudí, René Lalique, Otto Eckmann or Émile Gallé. Art Nouveau designs and buildings can often be asymmetrical. Although there are identifying characteristics, the style also displayed many regional and national interpretations.

Despite being a short-lived fashion, it paved the way for the modern architecture and design of the 20th century. It was the first architectural style without historic precedent, the 19th century being notorious for a practice known as Historicism, which is the use of visual styles that consciously echo the style of a previous artistic era. Between c.1870 and 1900, a crisis of historicism occurred, during which the historicist culture was critiqued, one of the voices being Friedrich Nietzsche in 1874, who diagnosed 'a malignant historical fervour' as one of the crippling symptoms of a modern culture burdened by archaeological study and faith in the laws of historical progression. Despite this, Art Nouveau was also heavily influenced by styles from the past such as Celtic, Gothic and Rococo art, and also by the Arts and Crafts movement, Aestheticism, Symbolism and especially by Japanese art.

==== Fauvism (c. 1898–1909) ====
Fauvism emerged from post-impressionism, gradually developing into the first major movement of the 20th century. Its genesis was in 1895 when Henri Matisse, the oldest and central figure, entered the studio of Gustave Moreau at the Ecole des Beaux-Arts. There he met Georges Rouault, Charles Camoin, Henri Manguin, and Albert Marquet. Marquet said "As early as 1898 Matisse and I were working in what was later to be called the Fauve manner. The first exhibitions at the Indepéndants in which we were, I believe, the only ones to paint in pure tones, go back to 1901." By 1902–03 the circle of like-minded artist had grown to include Georges Braque, André Derain, Raoul Dufy, Othon Friesz, Jean Metzinger, Jean Puy, Louis Valtat, Kees van Dongen, and Maurice de Vlaminck. During this period a number of influential retrospective exhibitions were held in Paris: Seurat (1900, 1905), Van Gogh (1901, 1905), Toulouse-Lautrec (1902), Gauguin (1906), Cézanne (1907), all relatively unknown to the public at that time. Matisse and Derain collected African carvings, a novel but growing curiosity of the time. Matisse spent the summer of 1904 in Saint-Tropez painting with the neo-impressionist Paul Signac and Henri-Edmond Cross, followed in 1905 by Camoin, Manguin, and Marquet. The artists exhibited regularity at the Salon des Indepéndants and the Salon d'Automne 1903–1908 and in 1905 their work created a sensation and a scandal. Matisse stated "We were exhibiting at the Salon d'Automne, Derain, Manguin, Marquet, Puy, and a few others were hung together in one of the larger galleries. In the center of this room the sculptor Marque exhibited a bust of a child very much in the Italian style. Vauxcelles [art critic for Gil Blas] entered the room and said, Well! well! Donatello in the mist of wild beasts! [Donatello chez les fauves]." The movement had not been perceived as an entity by the public, but once published the name stuck. Unlike the impressionist and their long struggle for acceptance, the avant-garde had an eager audience by 1906–1907 and the fauvist were attracting collectors from America to Russia. However fauvism largely dissolved in 1908, as cubism appeared, most of the artist began exploring other styles and moving in different directions. Only Matisse and Dufy continued to explore fauvism into the 1950s.

The fauvist painted landscapes en plein air, interiors, figures, and still lifes, following examples of realism, impressionism, and post-impressionism. They applied paint with loose brushstrokes, in thick, unnatural, often contrasting, vibrant colors, at times straight from the tube. Gauguin's influence, with his exploration of the expressive values and spatial aspects of patterning with flat, pure colors, as well as his interest in primitivism were significant, as was neo-impressionism. Matisse explained – for a long time color served as a complement of design, the painters of the Renaissance constructed the picture by line, adding local color afterwards – writing: "From Delacroix to Van Gogh and chiefly to Gauguin, by way of the Impressionist, who cleared the ground, and Cézanne, who gave the final impulse and introduced colored volumes, we can follow this rehabilitation of color's function, this restoration of its emotive power." Fauvism was the culmination in a shift, from drawing and line as the fundamental foundations of design in painting to color, and they depicted their subjects on the verge of abstraction.

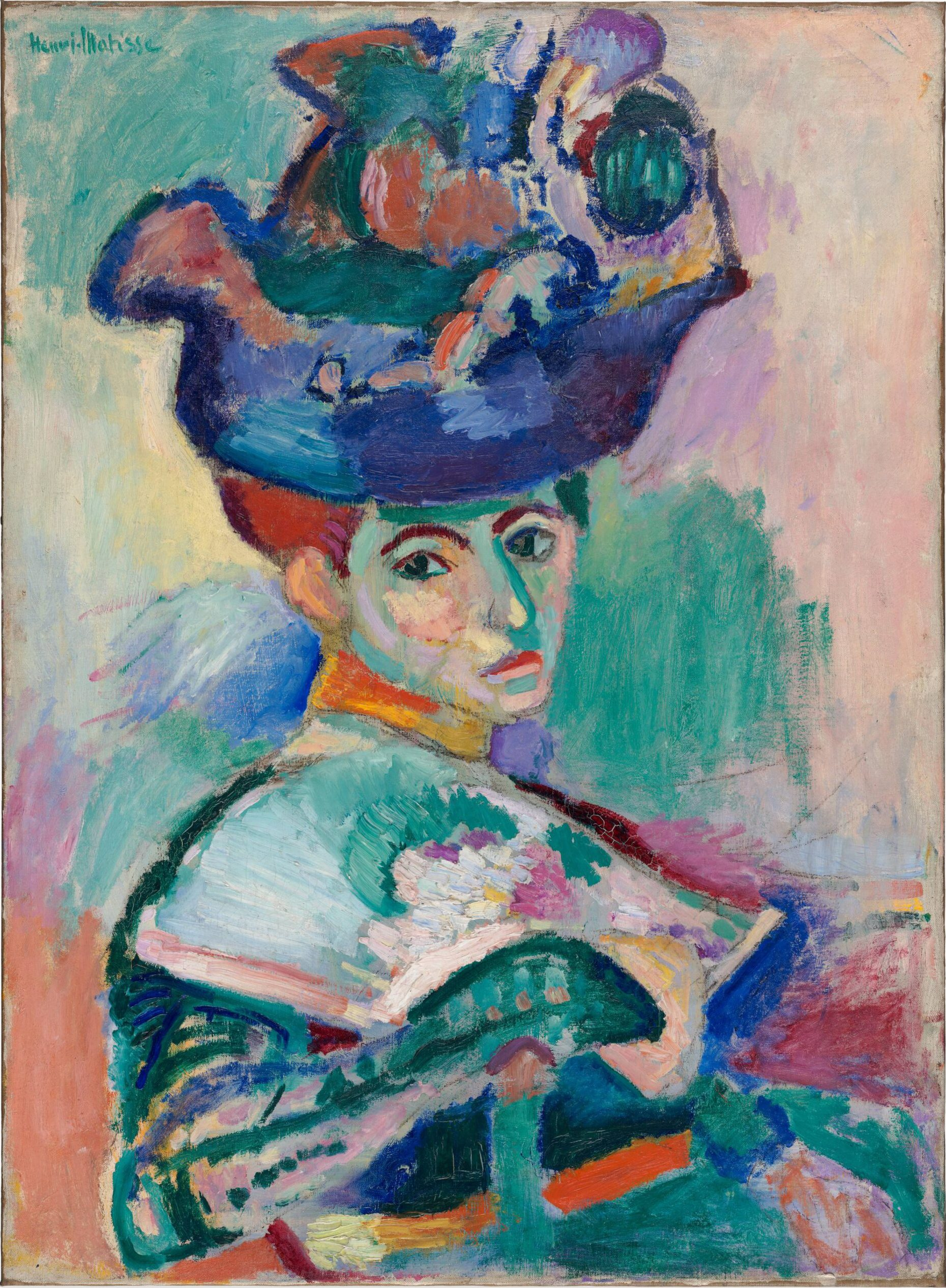
Woman with a Hat; by Henri Matisse; 1905; oil on canvas; 80.7 x 59.7 cm; San Francisco Museum of Modern Art (San Francisco, US)

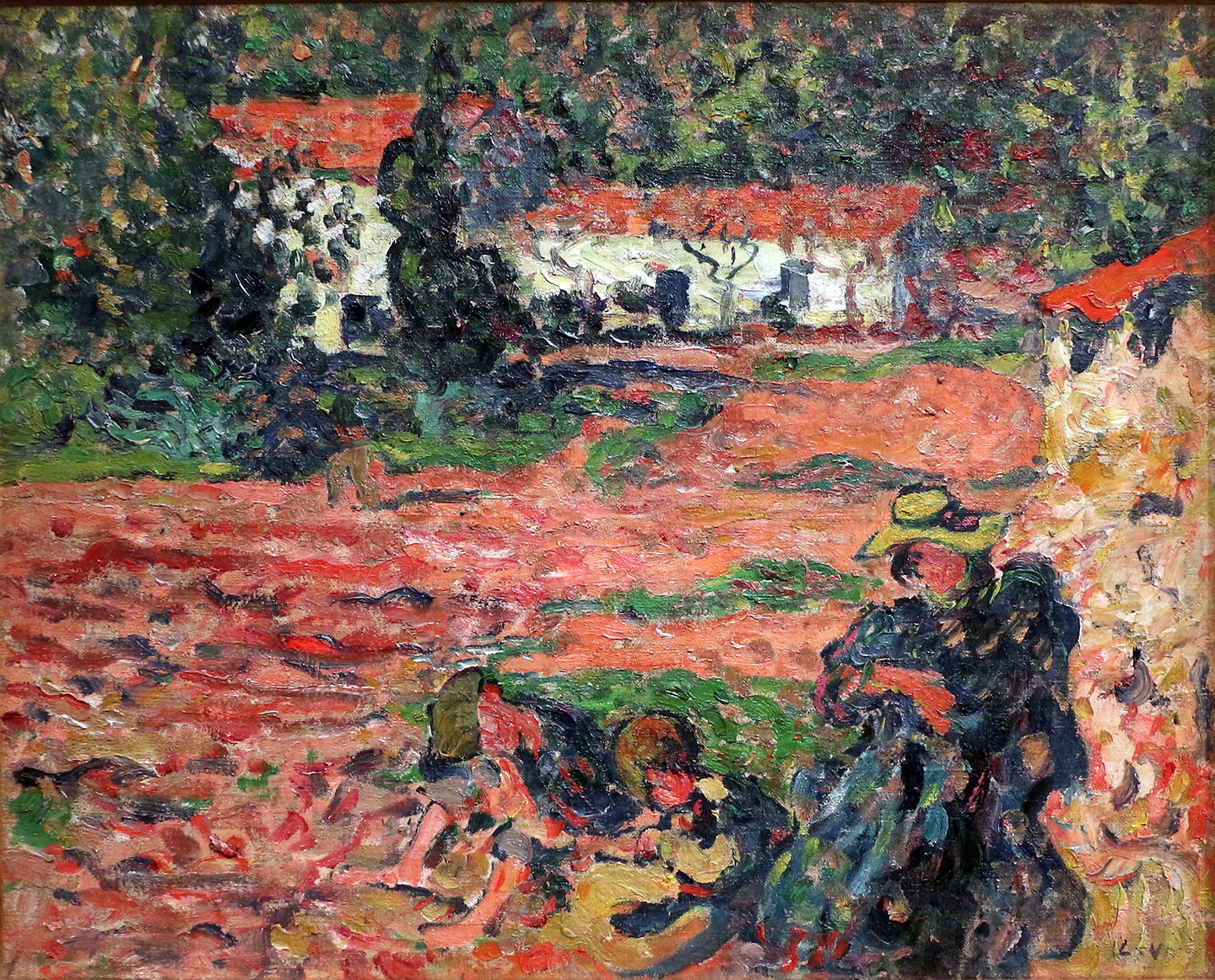
Fauve Landscape; by Louis Valtat; 1905–1906; oil on canvas; Speed Art Museum (Louisville, Kentucky, US)

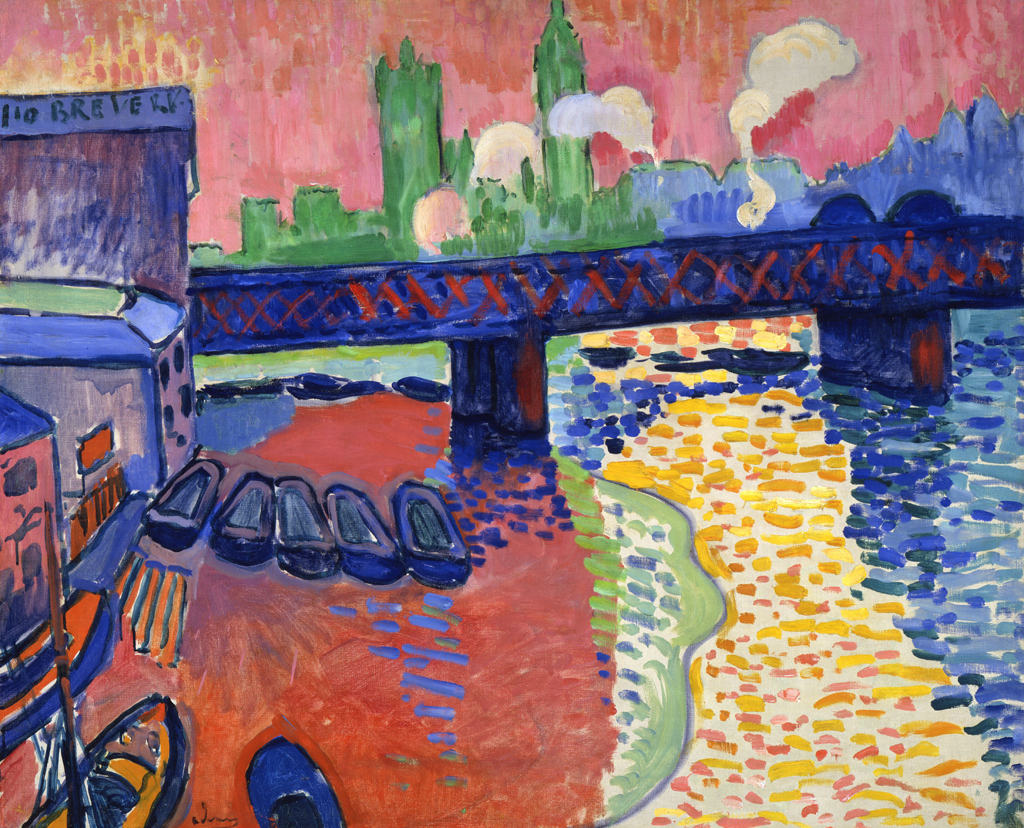
Charing Cross Bridge, London; by André Derain; 1906; oil on canvas, 80.3 × 100.3 cm.; National Gallery of Art (Washington, D.C., US)

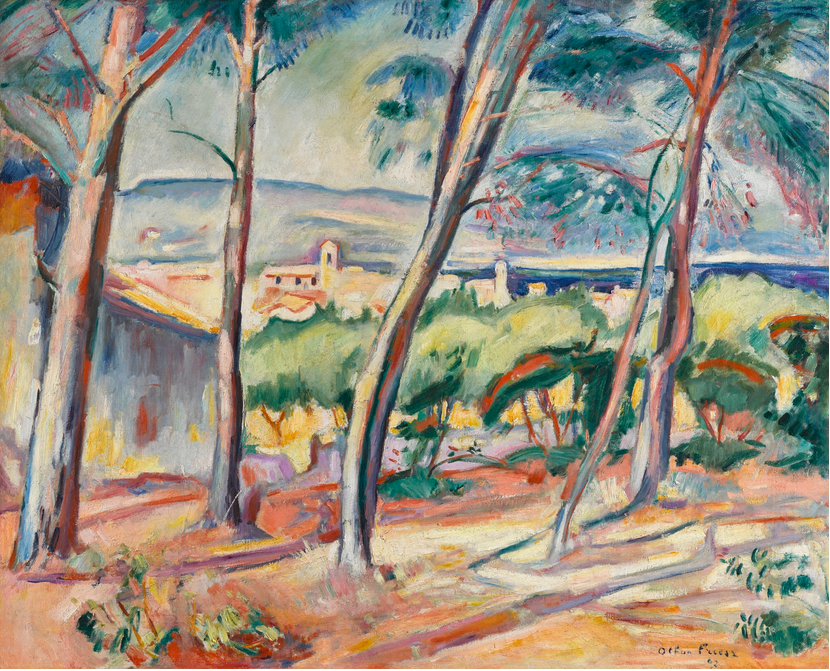
La Ciotat; by Othon Friesz; 1907; oil on canvas, 65.7 by 81 cm.; unknown collection

==== Expressionism (c. 1905–1930) ====
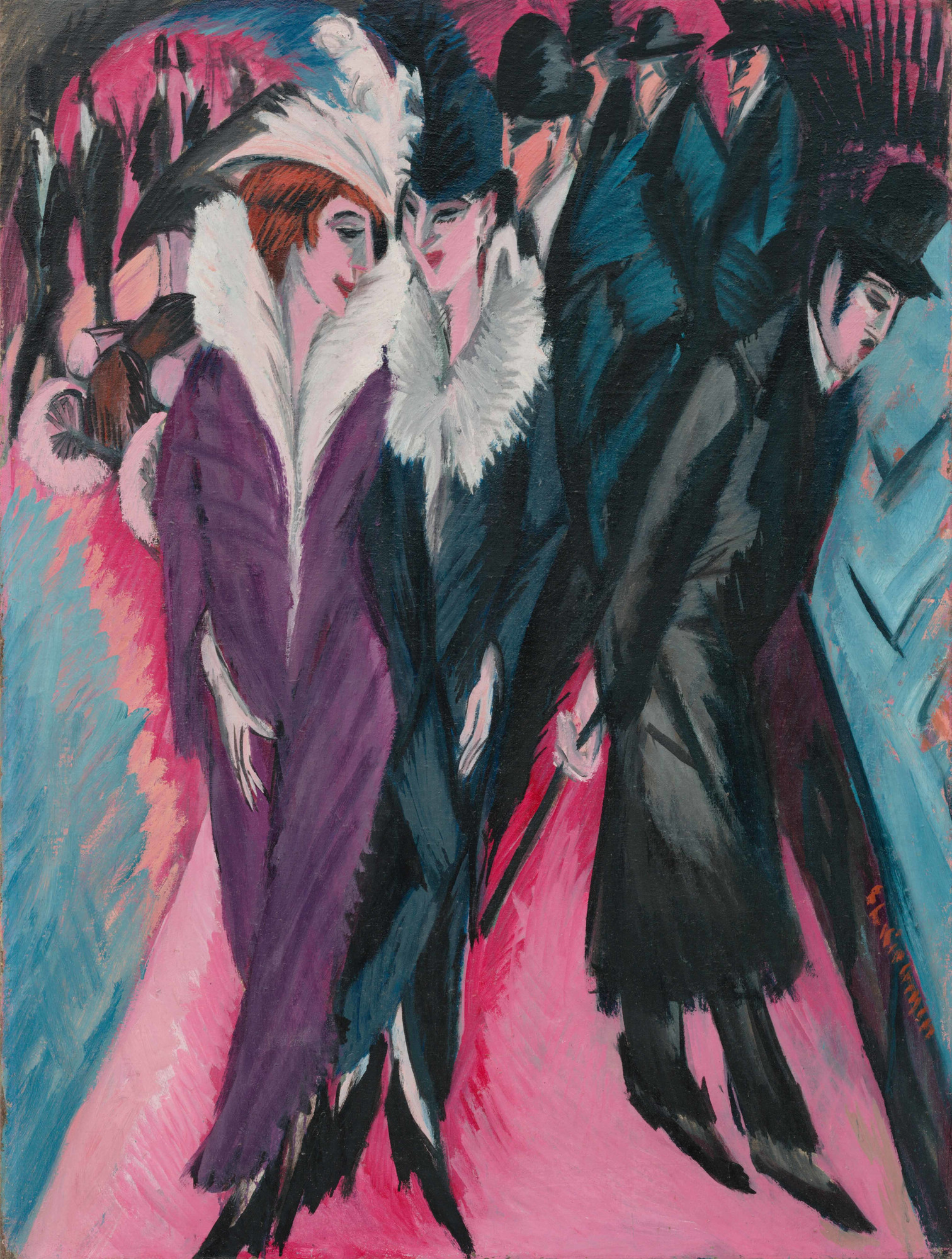
Street, Berlin; by Ernst Ludwig Kirchner; 1913; oil on canvas; 1.21 x 0.91 m; Museum of Modern Art (New York City)

Expressionism was an international movement in painting, sculpture, the graphic arts, poetry, literature, theater, film, and architecture. Some associate the Second Viennese School and other music of the period with the movement. Most historians place the beginning of expressionism in 1905 with the founding of Die Brücke ("The Bridge") in Dresden, Germany. However, several artists were producing influential work in the spirit of expressionism c. 1885–1905 including Lovis Corinth, James Ensor, Käthe Kollwitz, Paula Modersohn-Becker, Edvard Munch, Emil Nolde, and Christian Rohlfs among others. Many of these artists later exhibited and associated with various expressionist groups. Expressionist painting is characterized by loose, spontaneous, often thick, impasto brushwork. It often conveyed how the artist felt about their subject, opposed to what it looked like, putting intuition and gut feelings over realistic representations or art theories. Expressionism was frequently infused with an angst or joy, and an overall engagement with contemporary life and social issues that was often absent from fauvism's focus on design and color applied to neutral subjects. Woodcut prints are particularly noteworthy in expressionism. Expressionism can sometimes overlap and integrate with other styles and movements, such as symbolism, fauvism, cubism, futurism, abstraction, and dada. Several groups and factions of expressionists appeared at various times and places.

Die Brücke aspired to connect "all revolutionary and surging elements." It was founded by four architectural students Ernst Ludwig Kirchner, Erich Heckel, Karl Schmidt-Rottluff, and Fritz Bleyl. Sharing a studio in Dresden they produced paintings, carvings, prints, and organized exhibitions, separating in the summer to work independently. Their first exhibit was in 1905, later joined by Emil Nolde and Max Pechstein in 1906, and Otto Mueller in 1910 among others. Influences included Gothic art, primitivism, Art Nouveau, and developments in Paris, particularly Van Gogh and fauvism. The group shifted to Berlin in 1911 and later dissolved in 1913. Der Blaue Reiter (The Blue Rider: 1911–1914), founded by Wassily Kandinsky and Franz Marc, was a relatively informal group that organized exhibitions of art from Paris and Europe, as well their own. It was one in a series of increasingly progressive groups splitting from the Art Academy in Munich including The Munich Secession in 1892 (realist and impressionist), Phalanx in 1901 (postimpressionist), Neue Kunstler Vereiningung in 1909, and The Blue Rider in 1911. Artist associated with the latter two groups included the Burliuk brothers, Heinrich Campendonk, Alexej von Jawlensky, Paul Klee, August Macke, Gabriele Münter, and Marianne von Werefkin. The euphonious almanac Der Blaue Reiter, a collection of influential essays, and Kandinsky's Concerning the Spiritual in Art with his ideas on non-objective art were both published in 1912. The Blue Rider ended with the outbreak of World War I in which Macke and Marc both died.

Other artists such as Oskar Kokoschka, Egon Schiele, and Richard Gerstl emerged in Austria. French artist Georges Rouault and Chaïm Soutine had affinities with the movement. Sculptors include Ernst Barlach, Wilhelm Lehmbruck, Gerhard Marcks, and William Wauer. Architects associated with expressionism include Max Berg, Hermann Finsterlin, Johann Friedrich Höger, Michel de Klerk, Erich Mendelsohn, Hans Poelzig, Hans Scharoun, Rudolf Steiner, and Bruno Taut. Der Sturm (The Storm 1910–1932) was a magazine with much expressionist content founded by Herwarth Walden, with an associated gallery in Berlin opened in 1912 and a theater company and school opened in 1918. Films regarded as expressionistic, some considered as classics, include The Cabinet of Dr. Caligari (Robert Wiene, 1920), Nosferatu (F. W. Murnau, 1922), and Metropolis (Fritz Lang, 1927).

After World War I a tendency to withdraw from the avant-garde by many artist occurred, seen in the work of the original fauvists during the 1920s, Picasso and Stravinsky's neoclassical periods, and De Chirico's late work. This tendency was called New Objectivity (ca. 1919–1933) in Germany, and in contrast to the nostalgic nature of this work elsewhere, it was characterized by disillusionment and ruthless social criticisms. New objectivity artists mostly emerged from expressionist and dada milieus including Otto Dix, Christian Schad, Rudolf Schlichter, Georg Scholz, and Jeanne Mammen. Max Beckmann and George Grosz also had some association with new objectivity for a period. Although not intrinsically expressionistic, the Staatliches Bauhaus (School of Building: 1919–1933) was an influential German school merging crafts, decorative, and fine arts. Moving from Weimar, to Dessau, to Berlin, it changed and evolved in focus with time. Directors included architects Walter Gropius (1919–1928), Hannes Meyer (1928–1930), and Ludwig Mies van der Rohe (1930–1933). At various points the faculty included Josef Albers, Theo van Doesburg, Lyonel Feininger, Johannes Itten, Paul Klee, Wassily Kandinsky, El Lissitzky, Gerhard Marcks, László Moholy-Nagy, Oskar Schlemmer. Bauhaus architects greatly influenced the International Style, which was characterized by simplified forms, a lack of ornamentation, a union of design and function, and the idea that mass production could be compatible with personal artistic vision. As the Nazi Party rose to power, modern art was dubbed "degenerate art" and the Bauhaus was closed in 1933, subduing modernism in Germany for several years.

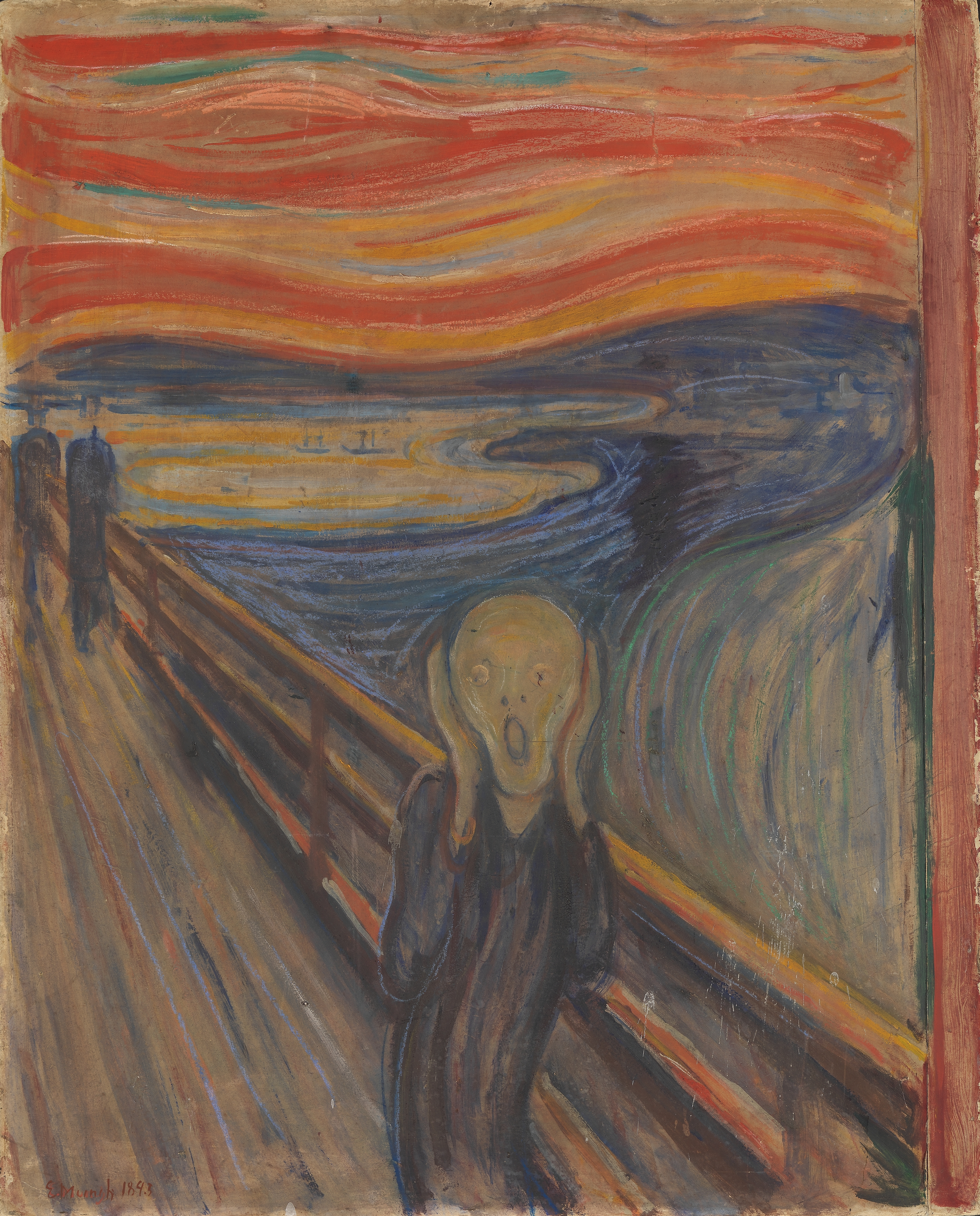
The Scream; by Edvard Munch; 1893; tempera and crayon on cardboard; 91 x 73.5 cm; National Gallery of Norway (Oslo)

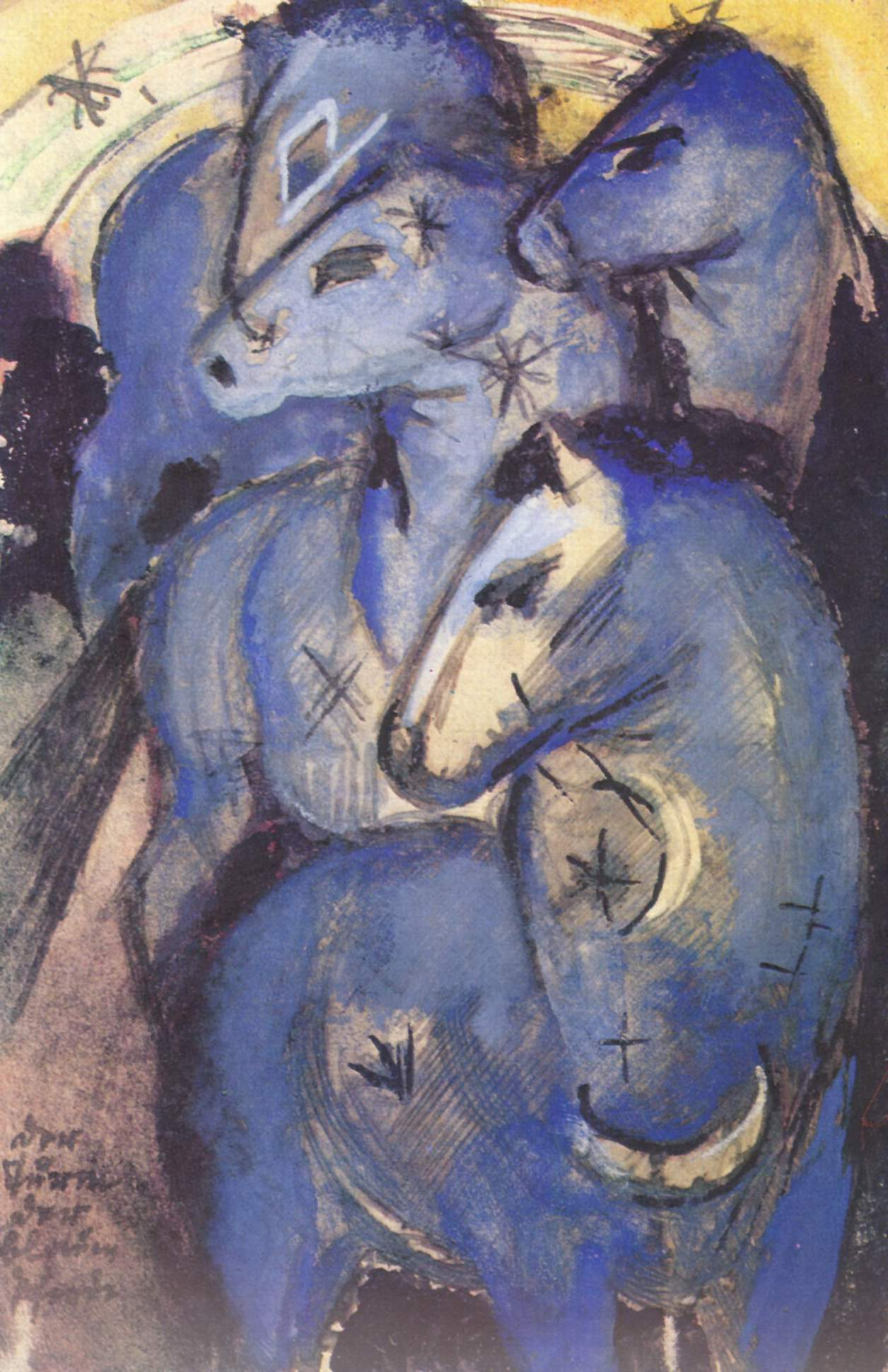
Tower of Blue Horses; by Franz Marc; 1912; ink and guache on card; 14.3 x 9.4 cm; Bavarian State Painting Collections (Munich, Germany)

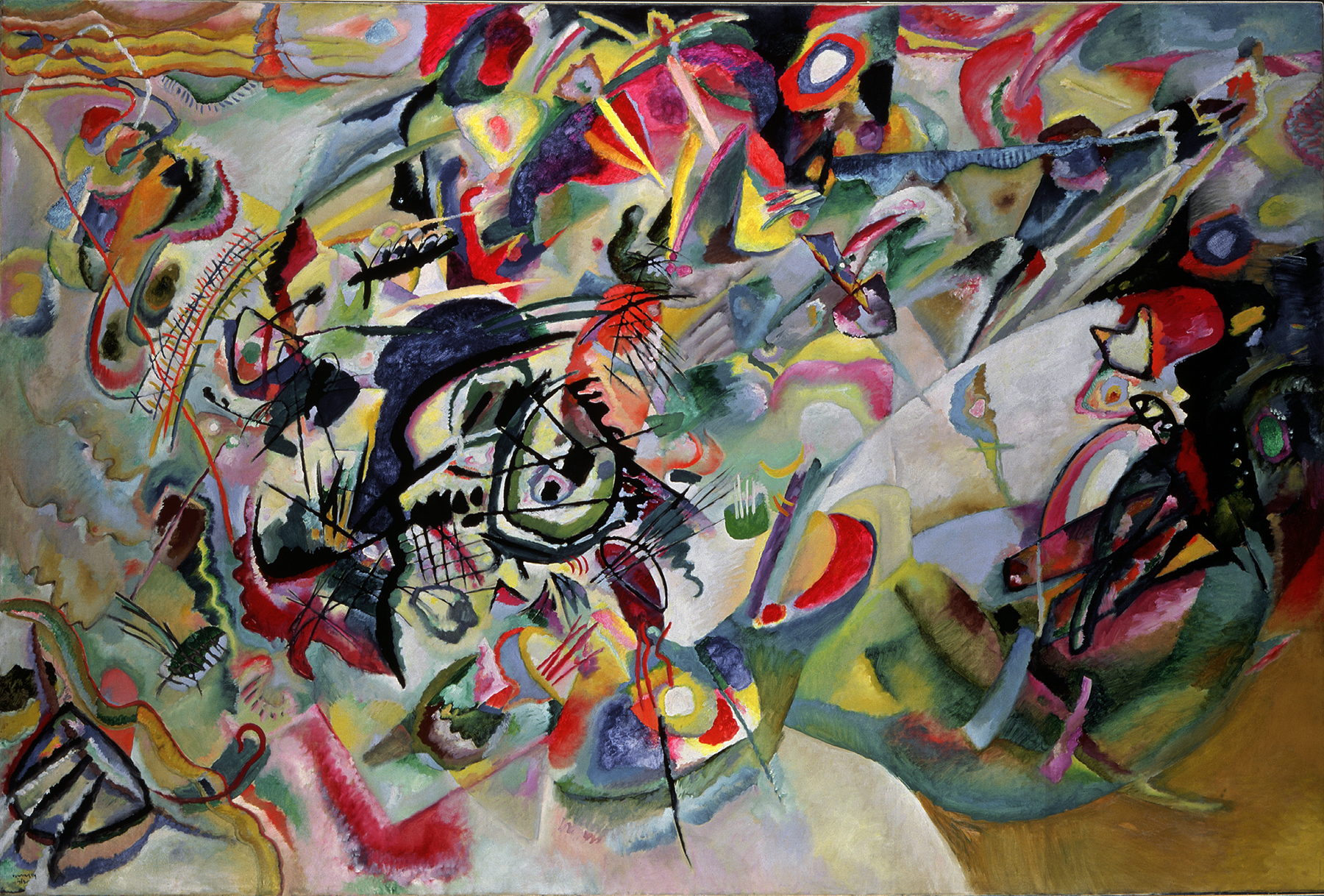
Composition VII; by Wassily Kandinsky; 1913; oil on canvas; 2 x 3 m; Tretyakov Gallery (Moscow, Russia)

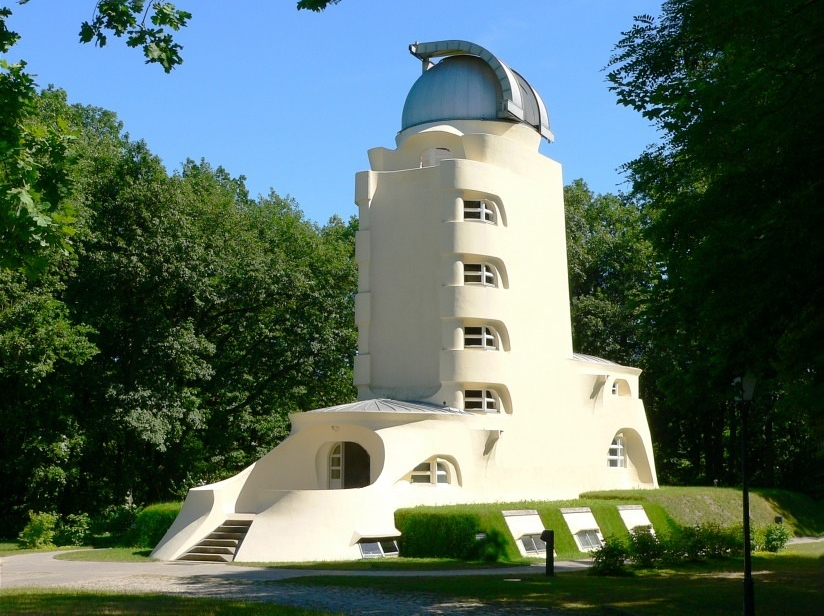
The Einstein Tower (Potsdam, near Berlin, Germany), 1920–1924, by Erich Mendelsohn

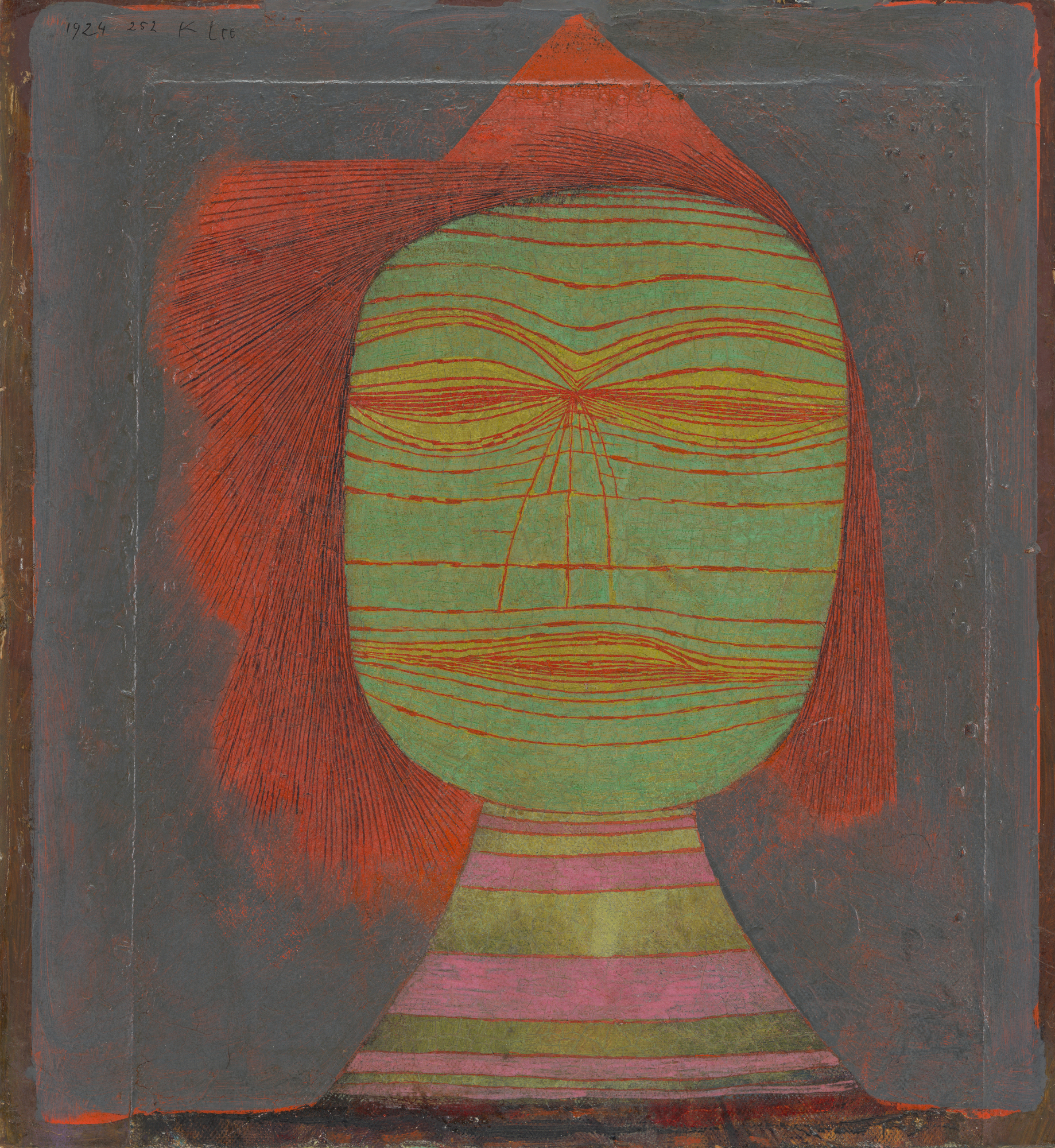
Actor's Mask; by Paul Klee; 1924; oil on canvas mounted on board; 36.7 x 33.8 cm; Museum of Modern Art (New York City)

==== Cubism (c. 1907–1914) ====
Cubism consisted in the rejection of perspective, which leads to a new organisation of space where viewpoints multiply producing a fragmentation of the object that renders the predilection for form over the content of the representation obvious. Pablo Picasso, Georges Braque and other Cubist artists, were inspired by the sculptures of Iberia, Africa and Oceania exhibited in the Louvre and the ethnographic museum in the Trocadéro, and which were being offered at flee markets and in sale rooms.

'A Picasso studies an object the way a surgeon dissects a corpse,' wrote the critic and poet Guillaume Apollinaire in 1913. Five years earlier, Pablo Picasso and Georges Braque – friends, colleagues and rivals – had begun to reject perspectival realism for a form of artistic autopsy: an utterly revolutionary painting style that looked inside and around objects, presenting them analytically, objectively and completely impersonally.

Les Demoiselles d'Avignon; by Pablo Picasso; 1907; oil on canvas; 2.43 × 2.3 m; Museum of Modern Art

Violin and Pitcher; by Georges Braque; 1909–1910; oil on canvas; 1.17 x 0.73 cm; Kunstmuseum Basel (Basel, Switzerland)

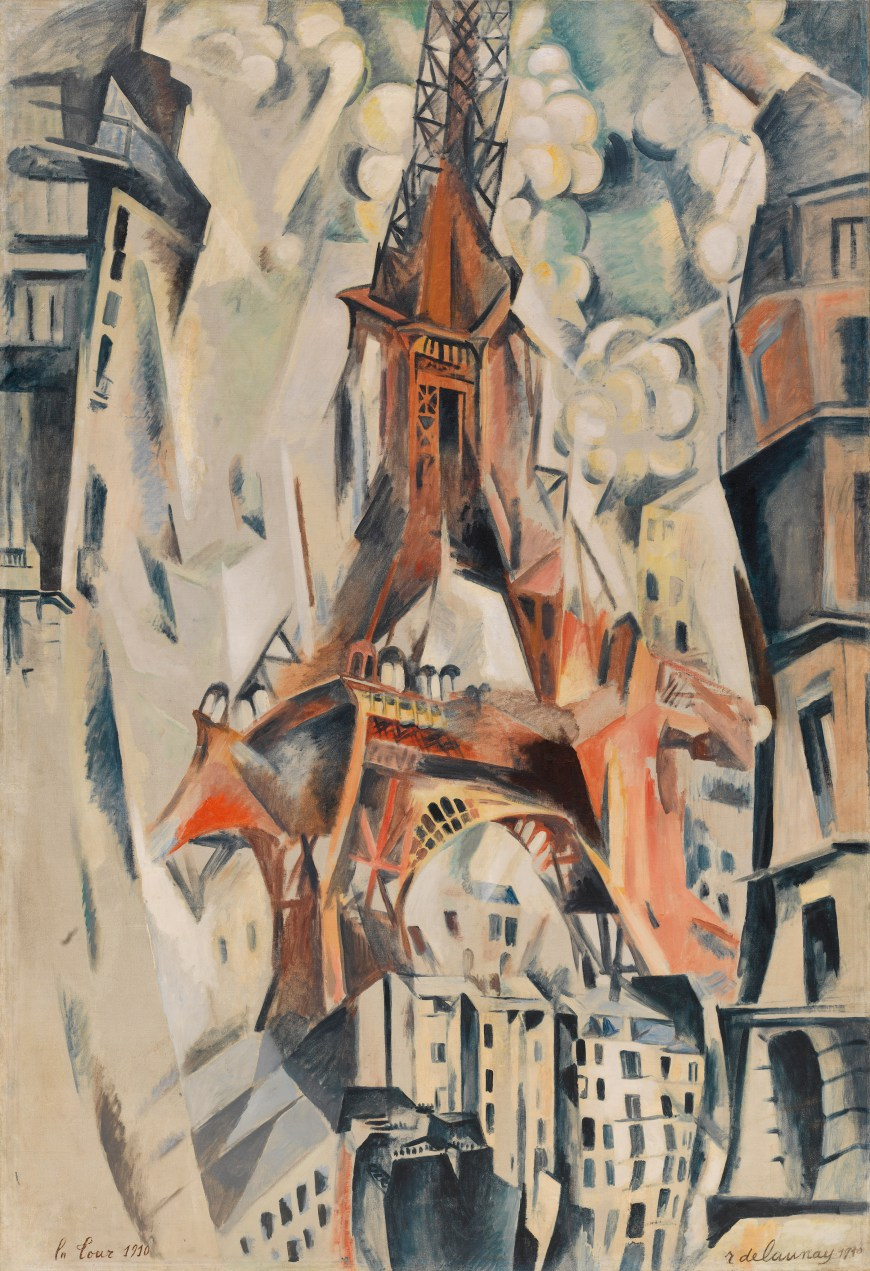
The Eiffel Tower; by Robert Delaunay; 1911; oil on canvas; 2.02 x 1.38 m; Solomon R. Guggenheim Museum (New York City)

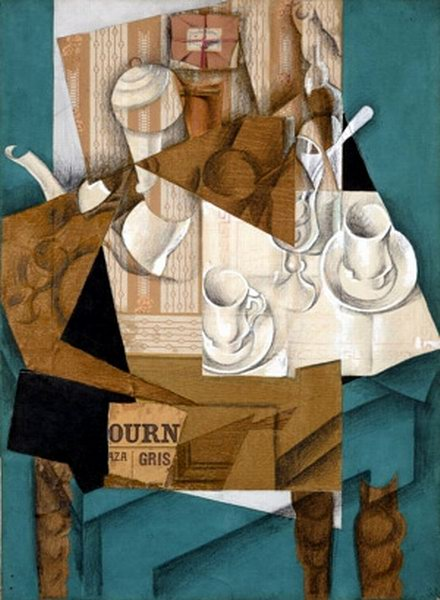
Breakfast; by Juan Gris; 1914; gouache, oil and crayon on cut-and-pasted printed paper on canvas; 80.9 x 59.7 cm; Museum of Modern Art (New York City)

==== Art Deco (c. 1920–1940) ====
Art Deco appeared in France as a style of luxury and modernity. Soon, it spread quickly throughout the world, most dramatically in America, becoming more streamlined through the 1930s. The style was named after the International Exhibition of Modern Decorative and Industrial Arts held in Paris in 1925. Its exuberance and fantasy captured the spirit of the 'roaring 20s' and provided an escape from the realities of the Great Depression during the 1930s. It had ancient Greek, Roman, African, Aztec and Japanese influences, but also Futurist, Cubist and Bauhaus ones. It sometimes blended with the Egyptian Revival style, due to the discovery in 1922 of the Tomb of Tutankhamun and the Egyptomania that it caused. Two examples of this are Le Louxor Cinema in Paris, 1919–1921, by Henri Zipcy, and the Egyptian Theatre in DeKalb (Illinois, US), 1929–1930, by Elmer F. Behrns. In decorative arts, including architecture, low-relief designs, and angular patterns and shapes were used. Predominant materials include chrome, brass, polished steel and aluminum, inlaid wood, stone and stained glass.

Some of the most important Art Deco artists are the Paris-based Polish painter Tamara de Lempicka, the Ukrainian-born French poster artist Adolphe Jean-Marie Mouron, known as Cassandre, and the French furniture designer and interior decorator Émile-Jacques Ruhlmann.

==== Surrealism (c. 1924–1966) ====
Surrealism emerged as a faction of Dada, formally announcing its inception in 1924 with André Breton's Manifesto of Surrealism. Originally a literary group of poets and writers in Paris, it soon developed into an international movement that included painters, sculptors, photographers, and filmmakers. A Second Manifeste du Surréalisme was published in 1929. Surrealism did not have significant expression in applied or decorative arts, architecture, or music, although a few isolated examples could be identified (e.g. chess sets, furniture, and Las Pozas). The small and short lived Metaphysical School (c. 1910–1921), with Giorgio de Chirico as its principal figure, was highly influential on surrealism. The surrealist explored a myriad of innovative techniques, some had recently been developed in Cubism and Dada, others were new, including collage, found objects, assemblage, random chance, rayographs (photograms), painting on sand, dripping and flinging paint, decalcomania, frottage, fumage, and raclage. Two fundamental approaches predominate surrealist art. Automatism dominated in the early years which can be seen in the work of artist like André Masson and Joan Miró. Other artists, swayed by work of Giorgio de Chirico, used more traditional methods and mediums to illustrate unfiltered thoughts and incongruous juxtapositions, including Salvador Dalí and René Magritte. Significant artist include Jean Arp, Hans Bellmer, Victor Brauner, Luis Buñuel, Joseph Cornell, Óscar Domínguez, Max Ernst, Wifredo Lam, Yves Tanguy, Man Ray, Alberto Giacometti, Méret Oppenheim, and Roberto Matta. Other important artist informally accosted with surrealism include Marcel Duchamp, Pablo Picasso, and Frida Kahlo. Surrealist ideas and theories were discussed in a successive series of journals, La Révolution Surréaliste (1924–1929), Le Surrealisme au service de la revolution (1930–1933), Minotaure (1933–1939), VVV (1942–1944). The automatic paintings produced by André Masson and Joan Miró, as well as latecomers to surrealism like Roberto Matta and Arshile Gorky had a considerable influence on the abstract expressionist in the late 1940s.

With a measure of Dada's irreverence and contempt for the traditional political, religious, and bourgeois values of western culture that they believed had led the world into the First World War (Breton and other founding members were veterans); the surrealist explored the possibilities that had been opened up by Sigmund Freud regarding the subconscious mind: "Pure psychic automatism, by which one intends to express verbally, in writing or by any other method, the real functioning of the mind. Dictation by thought, in the absence of any control exercised by reason, and beyond any aesthetic or moral preoccupation." Surrealism sought to express pure thought, unfiltered and uncensored by political, religious, moral, or rational principles.

The Song of Love; by Giorgio de Chirico; 1914; oil on canvas; 73 x 59.1 cm; Museum of Modern Art (New York City)

The Elephant Celebes; by Max Ernst; 1921; oil on canvas; 125.4 × 107.9 cm; Tate Modern (London)

=== Mid and late 20th century ===
As Europe struggled to recover from World War II, America moved into a position of political, economic and cultural strength. During the 1940s and 1950s, Abstract Expressionism emerged as the first specifically American art movement to have an international impact. In consequence, the art world's focus shifted from Europe to New York. Abstract Expressionists were a small group of loosely associated artists who had similar outlooks but different approaches. They were influenced by Surrealism, and believed in spontaneity, freedom of expression and abandonment of the themes of American life that had characterized national art of recent decades. One of the most famous representatives of this movement was Jackson Pollock, known for his painting made by pouring, flicking and dripping paint on to huge canvases on the ground. Other artists include Willem de Kooning, Franz Kline, Robert Motherwell, Barnett Newman, Mark Rothko and Clyfford Still.

After World War II, consumerism and the mass media surged, and as a result, Pop art developed in both London and New York. In a London exhibition in 1956, the word 'Pop' was used in a collage created by Richard Hamilton (1922–2011) made of American magazines. Pop art was a reaction against Abstract Expressionism, and interpreted ideas of pop culture. In celebrating and commenting on consumerism, pop artists, as they became known, produced colorful images based on advertising, the media and shopping, featuring film stars, comic strips, flags, packaging and food – things that everyone, rather than just a highbrow few, could relate to.

The term Minimalism was not new, but it gained momentum in the 1960s, specifically describing a style of art characterized by detached restraint. Originating in New York, it was a reaction against Abstract Expressionism, but it also embraced Constructivist ideas that art should be made of modern materials. Thus, Minimalist artists, primarily sculptors, often used non-traditional materials and production methods, often employing industrial or specialist fabricators to produce works to their specifications. The term was chiefly used to describe a group of American sculptors who re-evaluated the space around them, aiming to challenge assumptions and present familiar objects in new ways. Their artworks don't have any symbolism or hidden meaning, as they try to enable viewers to re-evaluate art and space around forms. Unlike a figural sculpture on which the viewer focuses to the exclusion of the room in which it stands, Minimalist art becomes one with its space. By focusing on the effects of context and the theatricality of the viewing experience, Minimalism exerted an indirect but powerful influence on later developments in Conceptual and Performance art, as well as providing a foil for the rise of Postmodernism.

Despite developing almost 50 years after Marcel Duchamp's ideas, Conceptual art showed that art does not always have to be judged aesthetically. It was never a single, cohesive movement, but an umbrella term that now covers several types of art and emerged more or less concurrently in America and Europe, first defined in New York. Conceptual artists promote the art of ideas, or concepts, suggesting that they can be more valid in the modern world than technical skill or aesthetics. No matter the art media of an artwork, it is considered as no more than a vehicle for presenting the concept. At its most extreme, Conceptual art foregoes the physical object completely, using verbal or written message to convey the idea.

Traditionally, many creative acts such as sewing, weaving, and quilting have been considered as women's work, described as crafts, and denied the cachet and public recognition of so-called high or fine arts such as sculpture and painting. Many artists have now challenged this hierarchy by either expanding the scope of a fine art such as sculpture, by creating soft sculptures using unconventional materials and practices, or by reclaiming and redefining the materials and methods of so-called craftwork, publicly exhibiting their work in museums and galleries and thus elevating the status of the decorative and applied arts. Artists of the twentieth and twenty first centuries effecting this radical change include Maria Martinez, Anni Albers, Lucie Rie, Lenore Tawney, Louise Bourgeois, Miriam Schapiro, Faith Ringgold, Magdalena Abakanowicz, Sheila Hicks, Marva Lee Pitchford-Jolly, Judy Chicago, and Dindga McCannon.

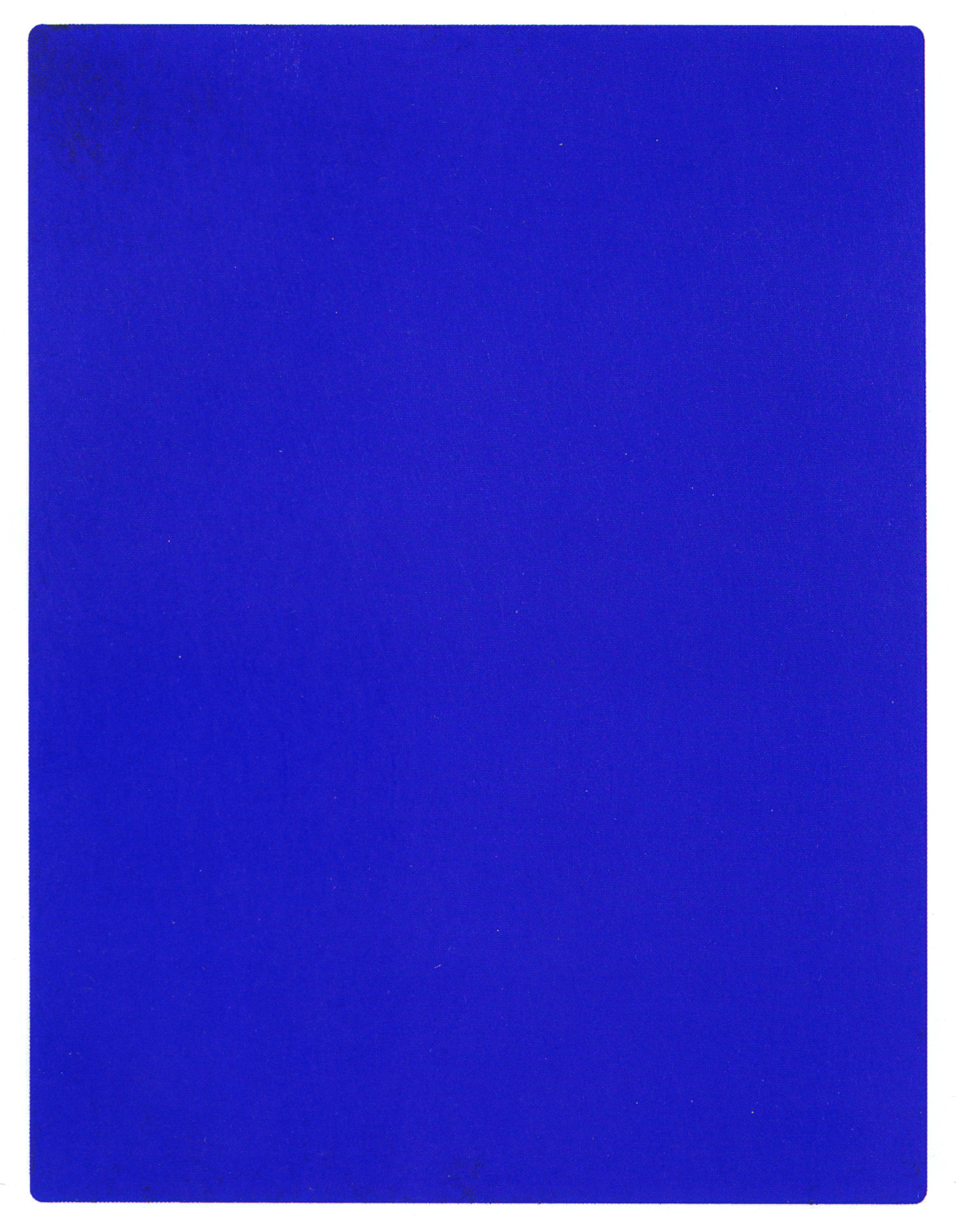
IKB 191; by Yves Klein; 1962

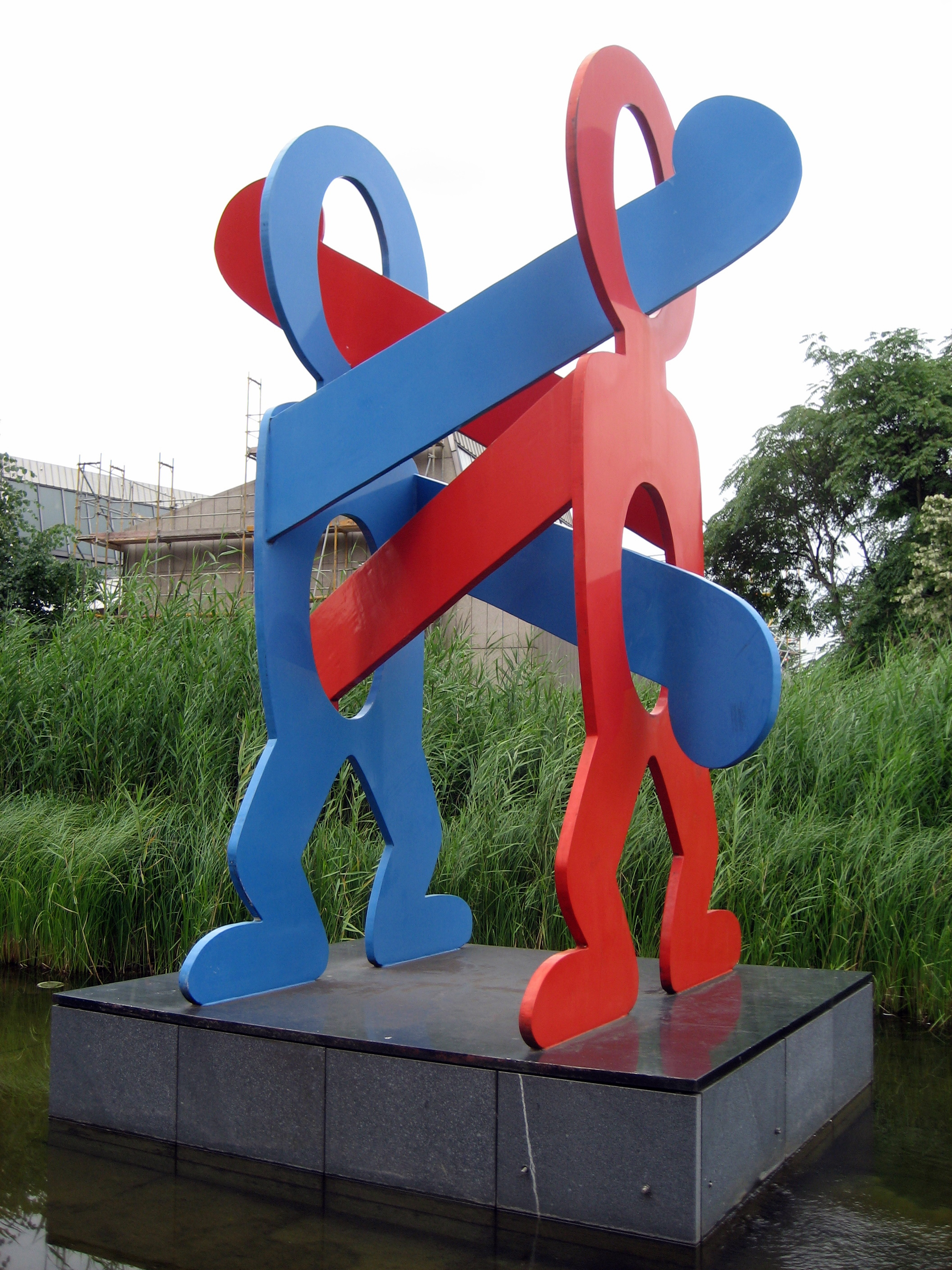
The Boxers; by Keith Haring; 1987

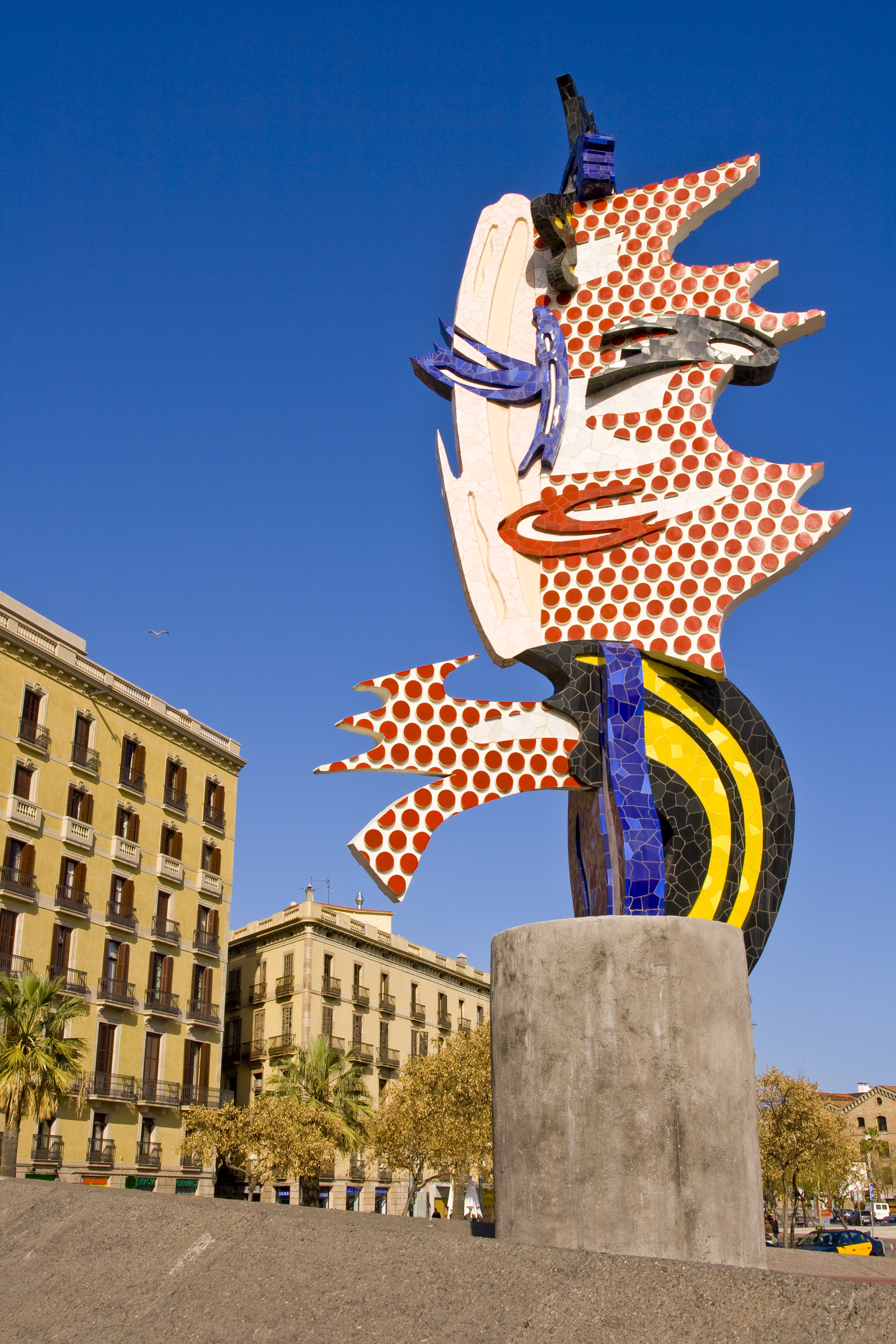
El Cap de Barcelona; by Roy Lichtenstein; 1991–1992

== See also ==
- History of animation
- History of Asian art
- History of film
- History of literature
- History of music
- History of nude art
- History of painting
- History of photography
- History of poetry
- History of theatre
- History of video games
- List of art movements
- List of French artistic movements
- Periods in Western art history
- Timeline for invention in the arts
- Timeline of art
- Women artists
