= Paracas (municipality) =

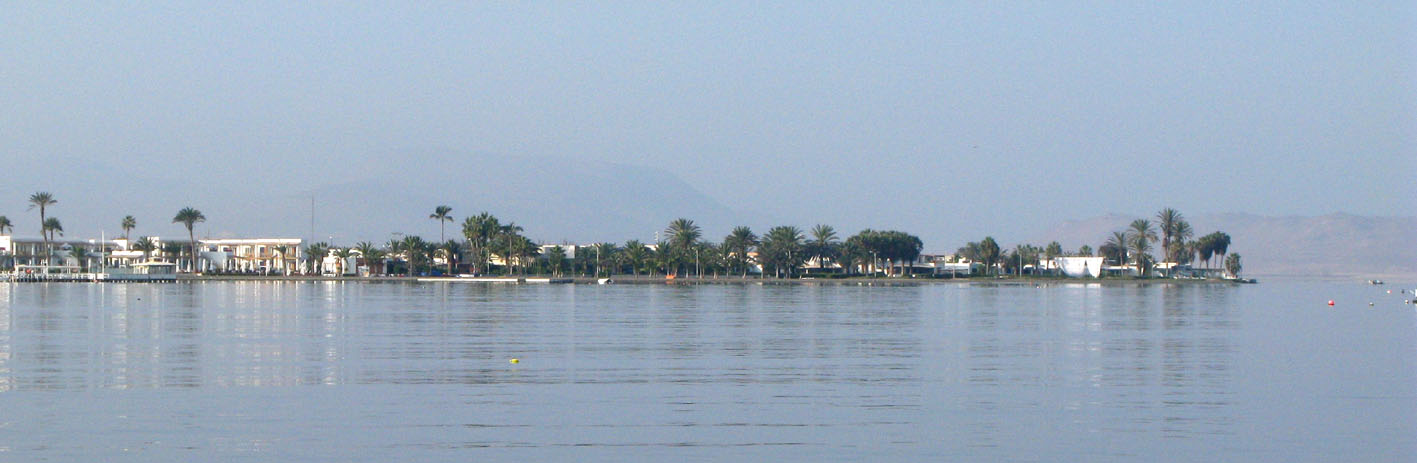
- Paracas as seen from the Paracas Bay

- Location within Peru
- Coordinates: 13°50′16″S 76°15′06″W
- Country: Peru
- Region: Ica
- Province: Pisco
- District: Paracas

Government
  - Mayor: Miguel A. Castillo Oliden

Population
  - Total: 4,146
- Time zone: UTC-5 (PET)

Paracas is the capital of the Paracas District in the Ica Region in Peru. A small port town catering to tourism, Paracas serves as the jumping point for tours to Islas Ballestas and to Paracas National Reserve. The Paracas Bay, protected by Paracas Peninsula, gives these shallow, warmer waters a break from ocean waves, permitting life to flourish, particularly near its southwestern edge encompassed within the Paracas National Reserve. The Museo Julio C. Tello, also found just near the southwestern edge of Paracas Bay, provides information about Paracas culture and the many unique species, particularly birds, inhabiting the area. Paracas lies in a windy area where strong air currents carry sand, hence the town's name "Paracas", from Quechua: para (rain) and aco (sand).

== History ==
On September 7, 1820, General José de San Martín landed at Paracas with six ships of his Peruvian Freedom Expedition from Chile.

== Hotel boom ==
Paracas has become one of the major beach resorts of Peru and has received much hotel investment. With the hotel boom of 2009, Paracas Bay added three 4 and 5 star hotels and two 3 star hotels.
