= San Gallán Island =

Island in Peru

Isla San Gallán (Spanish)
- Location within Peru

Geography
- Location: Pacific Ocean
- Coordinates: 13°50′20″S 76°27′01″W
- Area: 9.32 km^{2} (3.60 sq mi)

Administration
- Peru
- Region: Ica

Additional information
- Time zone: PET (UTC-5)

San Gallán Island, also known as Sangayán Island, is a Peruvian island located in the Pacific Ocean, 5,2 km west off Paracas Peninsula, separated from it by El Boquerón strait. The island lies within Paracas District, Pisco Province, region of Ica; and is also part of Paracas National Reserve.

== Geography ==
San Gallán Island has an area of 9,32 km² (4,5 km long, 3,85 km wide) and is located at 13º 50’ S, 76º 27’ W in the Pacific Ocean. At 0,5 km northwest of the island, the Mentiroso Islets can be seen. The main elevation of the island is located at La Viuda Hill (412 m).

The island's arid climate is influenced by the presence of the cold waters of the Humboldt Current. The island has a lighthouse with a light that can be seen from 20 miles.
