= Pisco (disambiguation) =

Pisco is a grape brandy produced in Peru

Pisco or PISCO may also refer to:

== Places ==
=== Peru ===
- Pisco, Peru, a coastal city
- Pisco Province, Ica Region
- Pisco District, Pisco Province
- Pisco (mountain), in the Cordillera Blanca
- Pisco River, Pisco Province, flowing to the Pacific Ocean
- Pisco Valley, Pisco Province

=== Portugal ===
- Pisco (Portuguese mountain range), Guarda District

=== Spain ===
- Pisco (mountain)
- Pisco (Spanish mountain range), Galicia

== Geology ==
- Pisco Basin, a sedimentary basin in southwestern Peru
- Pisco Formation, a Neogene-aged sedimentary formation in Pisco Basin

== PISCO ==
- Partnership for Interdisciplinary Studies of Coastal Oceans, a research organization that specializes in the dynamics of the coastal ocean ecosystems
- Peace International School, Ghana

== Other uses ==
- BAP Pisco (AMP-156), a Peruvian Navy landing platform dock
