= Édgar Núñez (politician) =

Peruvian politician

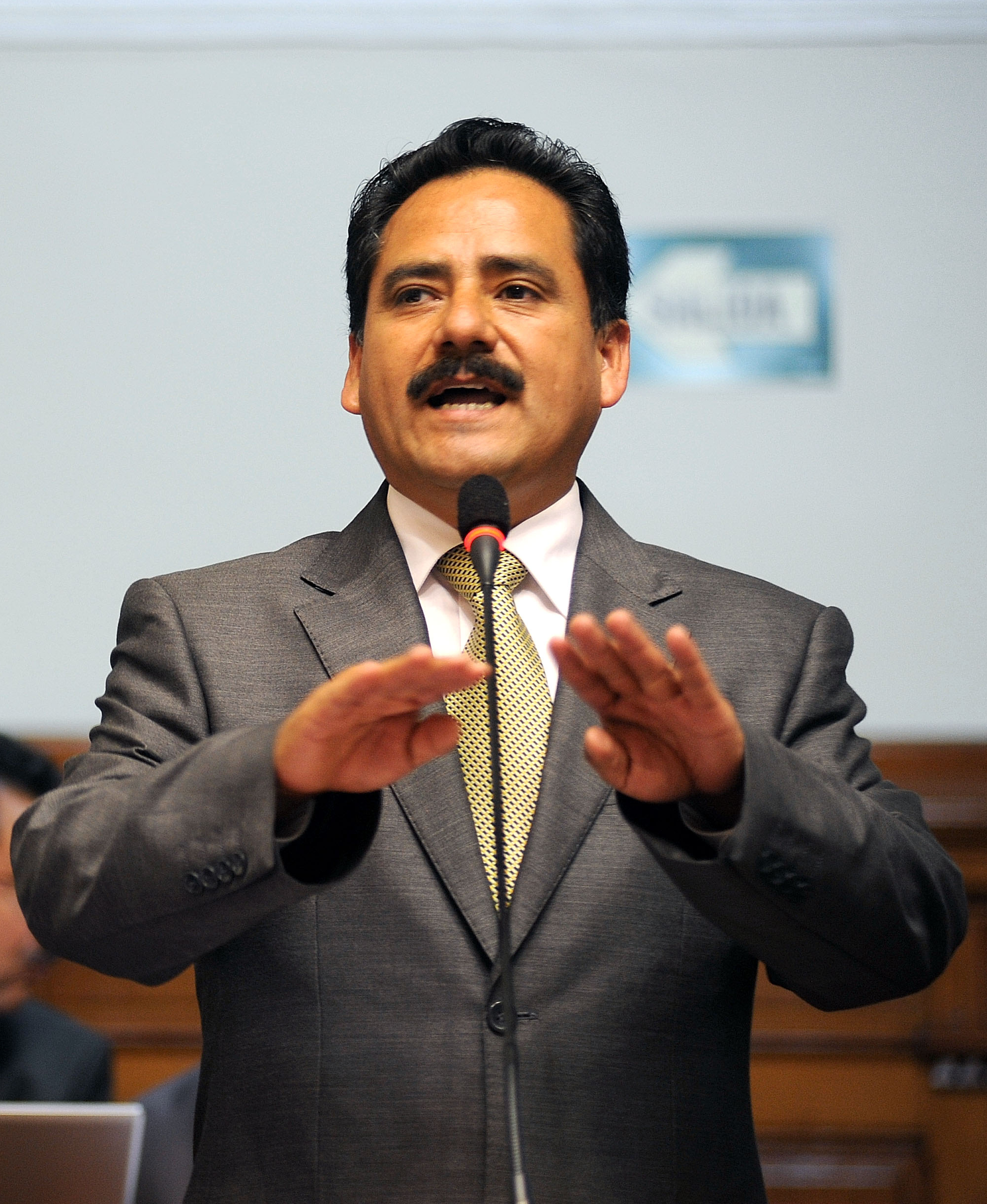
- Núñez in 2010

Member of Congress
- In office 26 July 2006 – 26 July 2011
- Constituency: Ica
- In office 26 July 1995 – 26 July 2000
- Constituency: National

Mayor of Pisco
- In office 1 January 1993 – July 1995
- Preceded by: Juan Roberto Díaz Buleje
- Succeeded by: Carlos Luyo Ocejo

Member of the Los Libertadores-Wari Regional Assembly
- In office 26 July 1990 – 5 April 1992
- Constituency: Ica

Mayor of San Clemente
- In office 1985 – 31 December 1989
- Preceded by: District created
- Succeeded by: Cecilio Ascona Mendoza

Personal details
- Born: Édgar Núñez Román; 23 January 1963 (age 63) Tintay, Peru
- Party: Peruvian Aprista Party
- Education: Saint Aloysius Gonzaga National University
- Occupation: Politician

Édgar Núñez Román (born 23 January 1963) is a Peruvian politician. He is a former Congressman representing Ica for the 2006–2011 period, and belongs to the Peruvian Aprista Party. He was previously a Congressman between 1995 and 2000. He also served as District Mayor of San Clemente from 1986 to 1989 and Provincial Mayor of Pisco from 1993 to 1995. During his tenure in Congress, he participated in the presentation of 161 bills of which 23 were approved as law, including the General Arbitration Law approved in 1995.

== Biography ==
He was born in the district of Tintay, Aymaraes province, Apurímac department, on January 23, 1963. His parents were Alejandro Núñez Palomino and Lazarina Román Quispe. He completed his primary and secondary studies at the José Carlos Mariátegui educational institution in the district of San Clemente in the province of Pisco, department of Ica. Between 1981 and 1986 he studied law at the San Luis Gonzaga National University in Ica. Between 2006 and 2008 he completed a doctorate in education at Alas Peruanas University, where he was vice-rector of the Ica branch since 2004.

=== Political career ===
A member of the Peruvian Aprista Party since 1978, he participated in the complementary municipal elections of 1985, being elected as the first mayor of the newly created district of San Clemente, being reelected in the municipal elections of 1986. In the regional elections of the Los Libertadores - Wari Region of In 1990 he was elected Representative to the Regional Assembly for the department of Ica. This charge was disappeared after Alberto Fujimori's self-coup. In the 1993 municipal elections, he returned to the municipal level and was elected provincial mayor of Pisco, holding that position until 1995. That same year he was elected Congressman of the Republic for the 1995-2000 parliamentary period. He unsuccessfully attempted reelection in the elections 2000 and 2001.
