= San Andrés District =

Coordinates: 13°43′51″S 76°13′17″W

San Andrés
- District
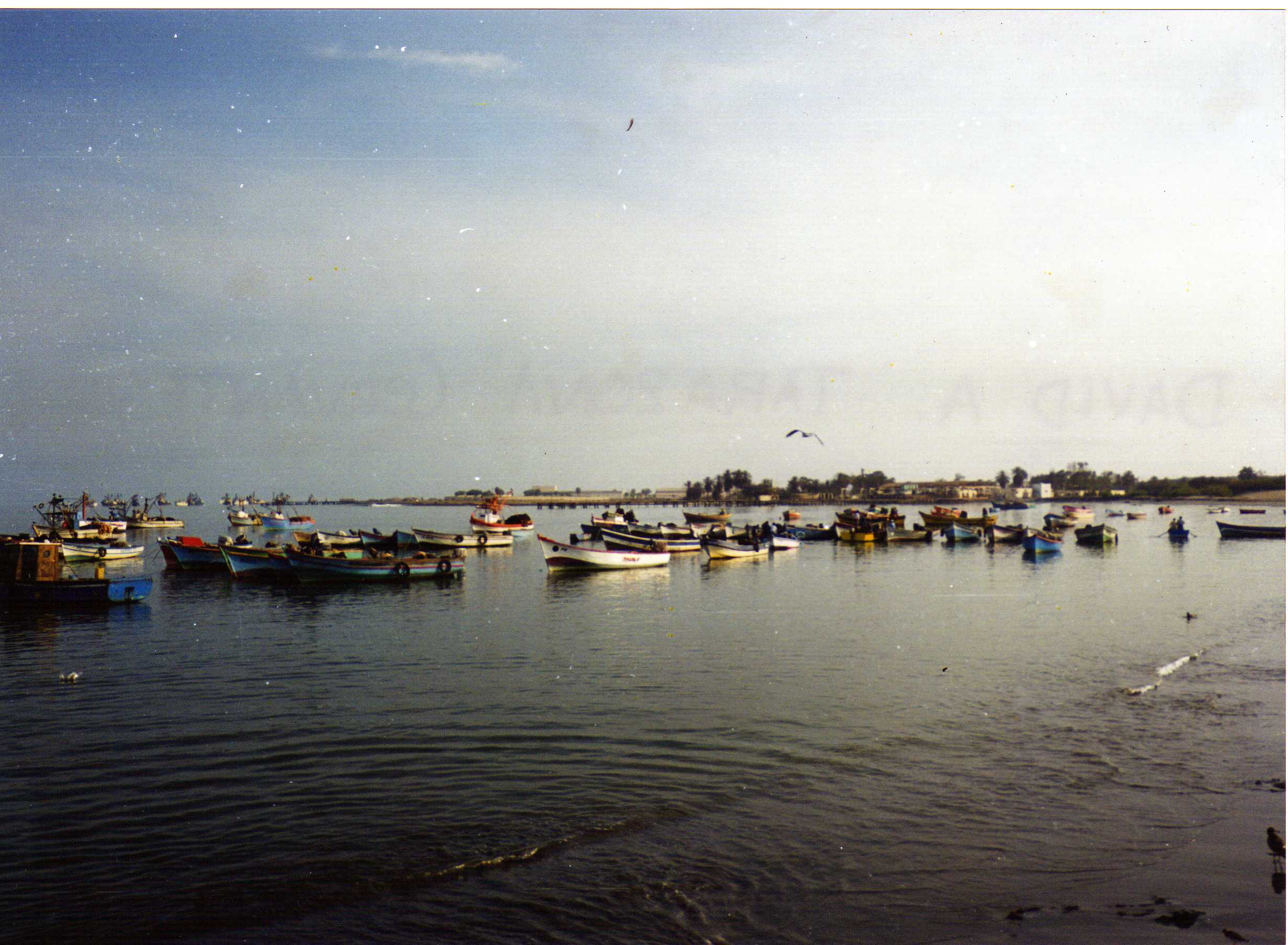

- Coat of arms
- Interactive map of San Andrés
- Country: Peru
- Region: Lima
- Province: Pisco
- Founded: October 19, 1900
- Capital: San Andrés
- Subdivisions: 15 populated centers

Government
  - Mayor: Juan Enrique Vergara Matta (2007-2010)

Area
  - Total: 39.45 km^{2} (15.23 sq mi)
- Elevation: 27 m (89 ft)

Population (2005 census)
  - Total: 14,134
  - Density: 358.3/km^{2} (927.9/sq mi)
- Time zone: UTC-5 (PET)
- Website: munisanandres.gob.pe

San Andrés is a district in middle Pisco Province in Peru. It is bordered by the Pacific Ocean on the west, districts of Pisco and Tupac Amaru Inca on the north, Ica Province on the east, and the Paracas District on the south.

Since the 1840s, the exploitation of the guano islands off the coast of the city of Pisco, brought as a consequence the arrival of crew members of ships of various nationalities, that is how, in the 1860s, Juan Falkoni ( Arguyani) Albanidis, a Greek sailor, takes Joaquina de la Cruz, a Peruvian from the area, as his wife, and they build their house in the location of the current district of San Andrés, (this house exists in the current location of Calle Grecia 110 in front of the plaza of arms and Greek atrium). Being this the first construction, and naming the first street with the name of Greece, later other immigrants settled down, all of them Greek sailors, such as Pedro Gkikas, Carassopoulos, Juan Comninos, Batikiota Kanelos, Francisco Penagos, Constantino, who also took native Peruvian women as wives and started the Greek Colony of San Andrés, that was the first foundation of the current town. Years later, Pedro Yika Briceño would be the first Mayor of the district. It is currently a prosperous district. It has a main square and many important streets duly paved.
