= Édgar Núñez =

Édgar Núñez may refer to:

- Edgar Núñez (chef), Mexican chef
- Édgar Núñez (footballer) (born 1979), Honduran footballer
- Édgar Núñez (politician), Peruvian politician
