= Huancano District =

Coordinates: 13.6006°S 75.6184°W

Huancano
- District
- Interactive map of Huancano
- Country: Peru
- Region: Ica
- Province: Pisco
- Founded: October 13, 1900
- Capital: Huancano

Government
  - Mayor: Julio Aurelio Rojas Ñañez

Area
  - Total: 905.14 km^{2} (349.48 sq mi)
- Elevation: 1,019 m (3,343 ft)

Population (2005 census)
  - Total: 1,528
  - Density: 1.688/km^{2} (4.372/sq mi)
- Time zone: UTC-5 (PET)
- UBIGEO: 110502

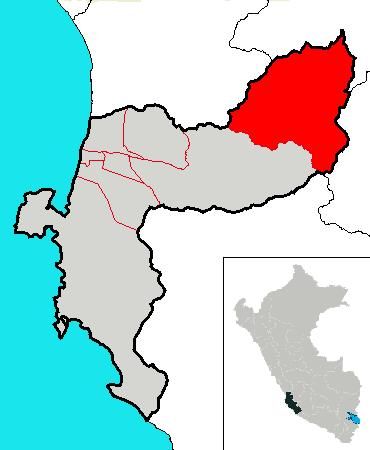
Location of the Huancano district, Pisco provinve, Ica Region.

Huancano District is one of eight districts of the province Pisco in Peru.

== Climate ==
Climate data for Huancano, elevation 1,005 m (3,297 ft), (1991–2020)
| Month | Jan | Feb | Mar | Apr | May | Jun | Jul | Aug | Sep | Oct | Nov | Dec | Year |
|---|---|---|---|---|---|---|---|---|---|---|---|---|---|
| Mean daily maximum °C (°F) | 27.8 (82.0) | 28.6 (83.5) | 29.1 (84.4) | 28.4 (83.1) | 26.6 (79.9) | 25.1 (77.2) | 24.9 (76.8) | 25.4 (77.7) | 26.2 (79.2) | 26.9 (80.4) | 27.1 (80.8) | 27.3 (81.1) | 27.0 (80.5) |
| Mean daily minimum °C (°F) | 16.7 (62.1) | 17.9 (64.2) | 19.0 (66.2) | 17.1 (62.8) | 14.9 (58.8) | 12.8 (55.0) | 12.1 (53.8) | 12.5 (54.5) | 13.5 (56.3) | 14.2 (57.6) | 14.6 (58.3) | 15.7 (60.3) | 15.1 (59.2) |
| Average precipitation mm (inches) | 3.5 (0.14) | 5.9 (0.23) | 4.0 (0.16) | 0.2 (0.01) | 0 (0) | 0 (0) | 0 (0) | 0 (0) | 0 (0) | 0 (0) | 0.2 (0.01) | 0.6 (0.02) | 14.4 (0.57) |
Source: National Meteorology and Hydrology Service of Peru
