= Pisco District =

Coordinates: 13.7000°S 76.2000°W

Pisco Pisqu
- District
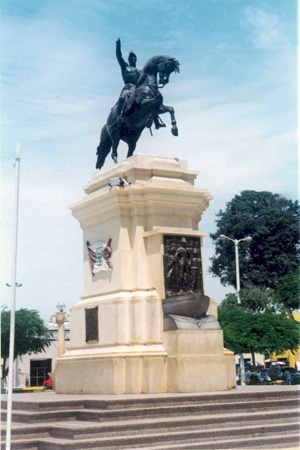
- Interactive map of Pisco
- Country: Peru
- Region: Lima
- Province: Pisco
- Founded: October 19, 1900
- Capital: Pisco
- Subdivisions: 15 populated centers

Government
  - Mayor: Juan Enrique Mendoza Uribe (2019-2022)

Area
  - Total: 24.92 km^{2} (9.62 sq mi)
- Elevation: 27 m (89 ft)

Population (2017)
  - Total: 67,467
  - Density: 2,707/km^{2} (7,012/sq mi)
- Time zone: UTC-5 (PET)
- Website: munipisco.gob.pe

Pisco is a district in middle Pisco Province in Peru. It is bordered by the Pacific Ocean on the west, the district of San Clemente on the north, the Túpac Amaru Inca District on the east, and the San Andrés District on the south.
