= Humay District =

Coordinates: 13.7225°S 75.8866°W

Humay
- District
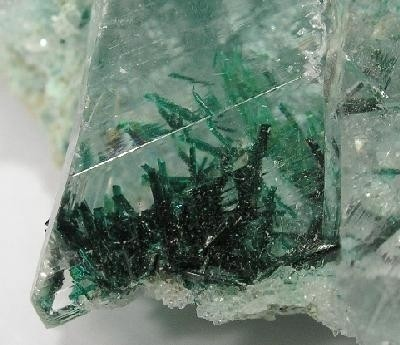
- Atacamite needles enclosed in clear Gypsum, Lily Mine
- Interactive map of Humay
- Country: Peru
- Region: Ica
- Province: Pisco
- Founded: June 25, 1855
- Capital: Humay

Government
  - Mayor: Claudio Pillaca Cajamarca

Area
  - Total: 1,112.96 km^{2} (429.72 sq mi)
- Elevation: 430 m (1,410 ft)

Population (2005 census)
  - Total: 5,499
  - Density: 4.941/km^{2} (12.80/sq mi)
- Time zone: UTC-5 (PET)
- UBIGEO: 110503

Humay District is one of eight districts of the province Pisco in Peru.

The Lily Mine, about 40 km (25 mi) east of Pisco, Peru, is a well-known producer of mineral specimens for collectors, and rough material for decorative stone-carving.

== Climate ==
Climate data for Hacienda Bernales, Humay, elevation 293 m (961 ft), (1991–2020)
Month	Jan	Feb	Mar	Apr	May	Jun	Jul	Aug	Sep	Oct	Nov	Dec	Year
Mean daily maximum °C (°F)	28.7 (83.7)	29.8 (85.6)	29.7 (85.5)	28.5 (83.3)	25.8 (78.4)	23.0 (73.4)	22.2 (72.0)	22.1 (71.8)	23.5 (74.3)	24.7 (76.5)	25.3 (77.5)	26.9 (80.4)	25.9 (78.5)
Mean daily minimum °C (°F)	18.7 (65.7)	19.4 (66.9)	19.0 (66.2)	17.0 (62.6)	14.3 (57.7)	12.8 (55.0)	12.0 (53.6)	11.9 (53.4)	12.5 (54.5)	13.4 (56.1)	14.4 (57.9)	16.6 (61.9)	15.2 (59.3)
Average precipitation mm (inches)	0.8 (0.03)	0.8 (0.03)	0.5 (0.02)	0 (0)	0.1 (0.00)	0.6 (0.02)	0.2 (0.01)	0.2 (0.01)	0.1 (0.00)	0.1 (0.00)	0.1 (0.00)	0.1 (0.00)	3.6 (0.12)
Source: National Meteorology and Hydrology Service of Peru

== See also ==
- List of mines in Peru
