= Wari Kayan =

Archaeological site in Peru

Wari Kayán is an archaeological site located on the Paracas Peninsula in Peru, approximately 250 kilometers south of Lima. It is renowned for its ancient cemetery, also known as the Paracas Necropolis, which contains hundreds of well-preserved funerary bundles dating back to the Paracas culture.

== Discovery and excavation ==
The site was discovered in 1927 by Peruvian archaeologist Julio C. Tello, often referred to as the "father of Peruvian archaeology." Tello unearthed 429 funerary bundles at Wari Kayán, which were buried 1–5 meters below ground. This discovery led Tello to identify a new cultural phase he named "Paracas Necrópolis," distinct from the earlier "Paracas Cavernas" tradition he had previously identified in the area.

== Funerary bundles ==
The funerary bundles, or "mummy bundles," found at Wari Kayán are notable for their exceptional preservation and the wealth of artifacts they contain. Between 1930 and 1960, approximately 100 of these bundles were opened and inventoried, revealing an extraordinary collection of textiles, ceramics, precious metals, and other grave goods.

=== Textiles ===
The textiles found in the Wari Kayán bundles are particularly significant, representing some of the finest examples of Pre-Columbian textile art. These include elaborately embroidered garments, shrouds, and other cloth items, many featuring complex iconography and vibrant colors.

== Cultural significance ==
The Wari Kayán cemetery provides valuable insights into the material culture and mortuary practices of the Paracas people. Research indicates that the site represents a period of cultural transition and interaction, with evidence of three distinct "material culture traditions" coexisting during the creation of the cemetery: late Paracas, Topará, and early Nasca.

== Platform mound ==
Wari Kayán is notable for its large platform mound, which is composed of multiple levels. The uppermost level includes a central plaza surrounded by smaller structures. It is believed to have served as a ceremonial or administrative center for the surrounding area.

== Ongoing research ==
Ongoing studies of the Wari Kayán site and its artifacts continue to yield new information about the Paracas culture and its relationships with neighboring groups. The "Prácticas en Vida, Presencia después de la Muerte: Lo estilístico y lo material en las Necrópolis de Paracas" project, supported by the National Science Foundation, aims to compile years of research by archaeologists, bio-anthropologists, and art historians to further our understanding of this significant archaeological site.

== See also ==
Paracas culture
