= Sailing at the 2015 Pan American Games – Qualification =

== Qualification system ==
A total of 140 sailors and 85 boats will qualify to compete at the games. A nation may enter a maximum of one boat in each of the ten events and a maximum of eighteen athletes. Each event will have different qualifying events that began in 2013. However on December 22, 2014 the Pan American Sailing Federation announced the total quota was raised to 148 athletes and 93 boats (with the laser and laser standard events each receiving an additional four boats). This was done because the event became an Olympic qualifier.

== Qualification summary ==
The following qualification summary and countries qualified per event are final and as of March 23, 2015.

Nation	Men		Women			Open					Total	
Nation	RS:X	Laser	RS:X	Laser Radial	49erFX	Sunfish	Snipe	Lightning	Hobie 16	J/24	Boats	Athletes
Argentina	X	X	X	X	X	X	X	X		X	9	16
Aruba				X							1	1
Bermuda		X		X							2	2
Brazil	X	X	X	X	X	X	X	X	X	X	10	18
Canada	X	X	X	X	X	X	X	X	X	X	10	18
Chile		X		X	X	X	X	X		X	7	14
Colombia	X	X					X	X			4	7
Cuba				X			X				2	3
Ecuador				X		X	X	X			4	7
El Salvador		X									1	1
Guatemala		X		X		X			X		4	5
Mexico	X	X	X	X		X			X	X	7	11
Peru		X	X	X		X	X			X	6	10
Puerto Rico		X				X	X		X		4	5
Saint Lucia				X							1	1
Trinidad and Tobago		X		X							2	2
United States	X	X	X	X	X	X	X	X	X		9	14
Uruguay		X		X							2	2
Venezuela	X	X		X		X			X		5	6
Virgin Islands		X			X	X					3	4
Total: 20 NOCs	7	16	6	16	6	12	10	7	7	6	93	148

== RS:X men ==
Event	Location	Date	Vacancies	Qualified
Host nation	—N/a	—N/a	1	Canada
2014 Miami Olympic Classes Regatta	(United States) Miami	January 26 – February 1	1	Brazil
2014 North American Championship	(Mexico) Cancun	February 19 – 23	2	Mexico; United States
2014 South American Championship	(Argentina) Buenos Aires	December 3 – 7	2	Argentina; Venezuela
2015 Miami Olympic Classes Regatta	(United States) Miami	January 25 – 31	1	Colombia
TOTAL			7	

== Laser Standard men ==
Event	Location	Date	Vacancies	Qualified
Host nation	—N/a	—N/a	1	Canada
2014 Miami Olympic Classes Regatta	(United States) Miami	January 26 – February 1	1	Brazil
2014 North American Championship	(United States) Long Beach	June 12 – 15	4	United States; Virgin Islands; Trinidad and Tobago; Peru
2014 South American Championship	(Peru) Paracas	October 18 – 26	4	Guatemala; Argentina; Chile; El Salvador
2015 Miami Olympic Classes Regatta	(United States) Miami	January 25 – 31	~~5~~ 4	Venezuela; ~~Dominican Republic~~; Uruguay; Puerto Rico; Colombia
Wildcard	—N/a	March 20, 2015	1	Bermuda
Reallocation	—N/a	—N/a	1	Mexico
TOTAL			16	

- The Dominican Republic declined the quota.

== RS:X women ==
Event	Location	Date	Vacancies	Qualified
Host nation	—N/a	—N/a	1	Canada
2014 Miami Olympic Classes Regatta	(United States) Miami	January 26 – February 1	1	Mexico
2014 North American Championship	(Mexico) Cancun	February 19 – 23	1	United States
2014 South American Championship	(Argentina) Buenos Aires	December 3 – 7	2	Brazil; Argentina
2015 Miami Olympic Classes Regatta	(United States) Miami	January 25 – 31	1	Peru
TOTAL			6	

== Laser Radial women ==
Event	Location	Date	Vacancies	Qualified
Host nation	—N/a	—N/a	1	Canada
2014 Miami Olympic Classes Regatta	(United States) Miami	January 26 – February 1	1	United States
2014 North American Championship	(United States) Long Beach	June 12 – 15	4	Peru; Guatemala; Venezuela; Brazil
2014 South American Championship	(Peru) Paracas	October 18 – 26	4	Chile; Argentina; Uruguay; Aruba
2015 Miami Olympic Classes Regatta	(United States) Miami	January 25 – 31	3	Mexico; Saint Lucia; Bermuda
Wildcards	—N/a	March 20, 2015	3	Cuba; Ecuador; Trinidad and Tobago
TOTAL			16	

== 49erFX women ==
Event	Location	Date	Vacancies	Qualified
Host nation	—N/a	—N/a	1	Canada
2014 South American Championship	(Brazil) Rio de Janeiro	November 5 – 8	3	Brazil; Argentina; Chile
2015 Miami Olympic Classes Regatta	(United States) Miami	January 25 – 31	2	United States; Virgin Islands
TOTAL			6	

== Sunfish open ==
Event	Location	Date	Vacancies	Qualified
Host nation	—N/a	—N/a	1	Canada
2014 Midwinters	(United States) Pensacola	March 27 – 29	2	Ecuador; United States
2014 North American Championship	(United States) Long Beach	July 28 – August 2	4	Chile; Peru; Guatemala; Mexico
2014 South American and Caribbean Championship	(Peru) Paracas	November 17 – 21	4	Venezuela; Brazil; Argentina; Puerto Rico
2015 Midwinters	(United States) Melbourne	March 20 – 22	1	Virgin Islands
TOTAL			12	

== Snipe open ==
Event	Location	Date	Vacancies	Qualified
Host nation	—N/a	—N/a	1	Canada
2013 South American Championship	(Uruguay) Montevideo	March 27 – 30	2	Brazil; Argentina
2014 South American Championship	(Brazil) Porto Alegre	April 16 – 20	2	Peru; Chile
2015 Midwinters	(United States) San Diego	September 6 – 13	5	Puerto Rico; United States; Cuba; Ecuador; Colombia
TOTAL			10	

== Lightning mixed ==
Event	Location	Date	Vacancies	Qualified
Host nation	—N/a	—N/a	1	Canada
2014 North American Championship	(United States) Sheboygan	August 9 – 15	3	United States; Chile; Brazil
2014 South American Championship	(Ecuador) Salinas	December 4 – 7	3	Argentina; Ecuador; Colombia
TOTAL			7	

== Hobie 16 open ==
Event	Location	Date	Vacancies	Qualified
Host nation	—N/a	—N/a	1	Canada
2014 North American Championship	(United States) Delaware	September 22 – 26	3	Puerto Rico; United States; Guatemala
2014 South American Championship	(Brazil) Pernambuco	November 6 – 9	3	Mexico; Brazil; Venezuela
TOTAL			7	

== J/24 open ==
Event	Location	Date	Vacancies	Qualified
Host nation	—N/a	—N/a	1	Canada
2014 North American Championship	(Mexico) Puerto Vallarta	March 16 – 21	2	Peru; Mexico
2014 Semana de Buenos Aires	(Argentina) Buenos Aires	October 11 – 13	1	Argentina
2014 South American Championship	(Peru) La Punta-Callao	November 10 – 16	2	Brazil; Chile
TOTAL			6	
