= Rafael Yamashiro =

Peruvian politician

- ラファエル・ヤマシロ
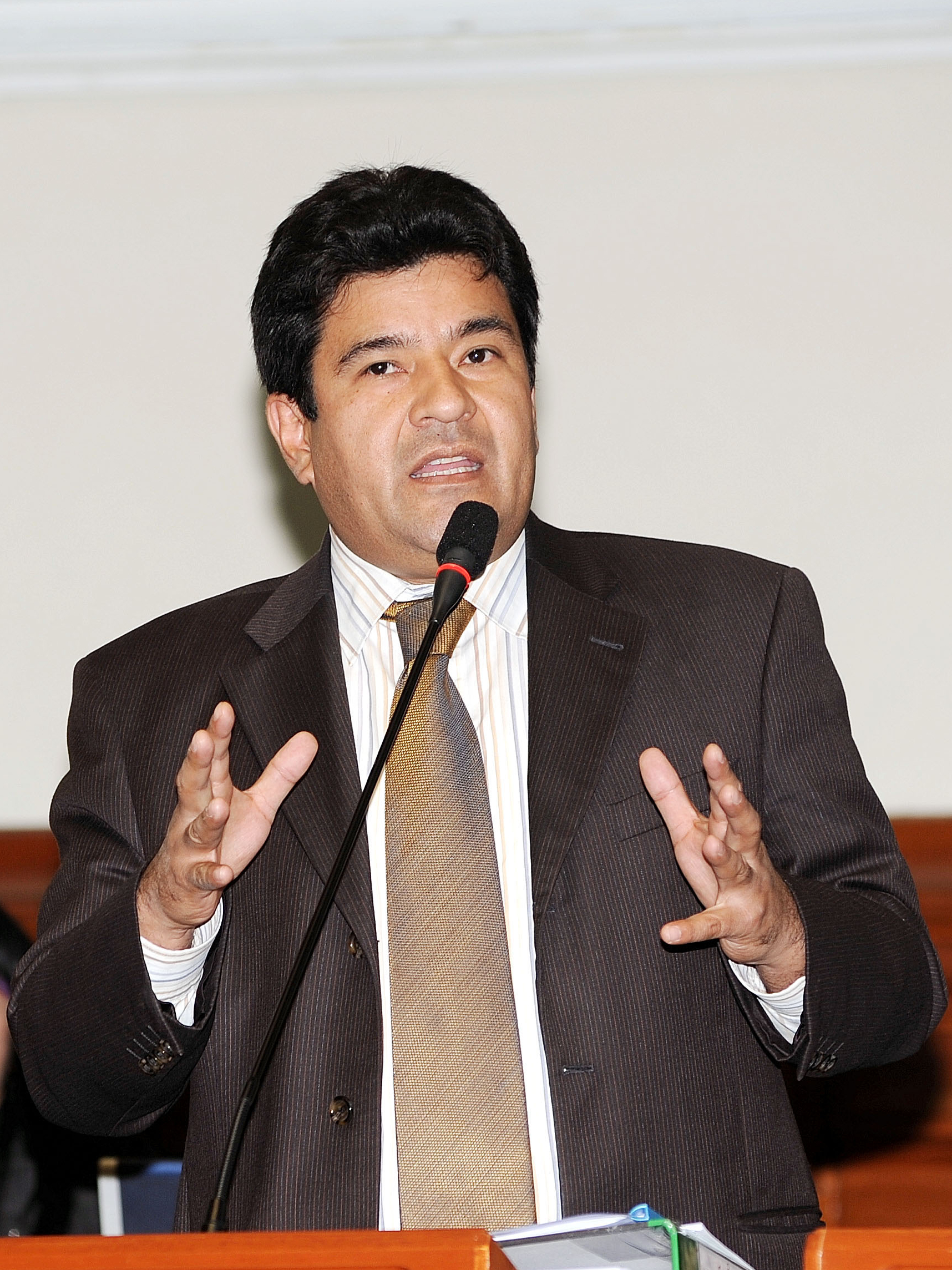
- Yamashiro in 2010

Senator of the Republic
- Incumbent
- Assumed office 26 July 2026
- Constituency: Ica

Member of Congress
- In office 26 July 2006 – 26 July 2011
- Constituency: Ica

Lima City Councilman
- In office 1 January 2015 – 31 December 2018

Personal details
- Born: Rafael Gustavo Yamashiro Oré; 25 June 1963 (age 63) Ica, Peru
- Party: Popular Force
- Other political affiliations: Christian People's Party
- Education: University of Lima
- Occupation: Politician

Rafael Gustavo Yamashiro Oré (born 25 June 1963) is a Peruvian politician and a former Congressman representing Ica for the period 2006-2011 and belongs to the Christian People's Party. Yamashiro lost his seat in the 2011 elections when he ran for re-election under the Alliance for the Great Change. In the 2016 elections, he ran for a seat in Lima under the Popular Alliance which grouped the PPC and the APRA but he was not elected.

== Education ==
From a Japanese family father, Kenzo Yamashiro Kamimoto, and an Ica mother, Victoria Oré de Romaña. He studied business administration at the University of Lima in Peru, beginning his studies in 1981 and culminating in 1987. In 2003 he would study Political Management in Madrid and Brussels, and in 2005 he completed his Political Science studies in Huancayo.

== Political career ==
=== Early political career ===
In 2001 he began as a Strategy and Development Officer for the Christian Popular Party, a position he would hold until 2003. For the 2001 general elections, he was "Coordinator of the Presidential Campaign (Ica)" of Unidad Nacional.

He was a Candidate for Mayor of Ica for National Unity in the 2002 elections, obtaining around 40 thousand votes, which meant losing by a difference of 1000 votes, thus being the winner the candidate of the Apristas. In 2003 he would be appointed as Regional Secretary of Ica of the Christian Popular Party.

=== Congressman ===
In the general elections of 2006, he was a candidate for the Congress of the Republic of Peru representing his native Ica. He was elected as a member of the National Unity, within the ranks of the Christian People’s Party.

He was a candidate for the third vice presidency of Congress for the 2007-08 legislature, in the list was headed by Congressman Javier Bedoya de Vivanco, which lost against the list of the Aprista ruling party headed by Luis Gonzales Posada. In the 2007-2008 legislature he was President of the Economic Commission.

He was nominated as a candidate for the Presidency of Congress for the 2008-09 legislature by the opposition list, with the full support of the National Unity, the Fujimoristas, a certain sector of the UPP and the nationalists. However, he withdrew his candidacy to endorse the list headed by a congressman proposed by the Nationalists, who ultimately lost.

In the 2008-09 legislature, he was appointed vice chair of the Budget Committee. Being vice president of the Petroaudios investigative commission, he signed the opinion that exonerated the then ministers Jorge del Castillo, Hernán Garrido Lecca and Carlos Vallejos from political responsibility and constitutional infractions.

The National Unity bench appointed Congressman Rafael Yamashiro as spokesman for the parliamentary group during the legislative period 2009-10. For the period 2010-11 Yamashiro was appointed President of the Economic Commission.
