= Paracas Bay =

Bay in the department of Ica, Peru

Coordinates: 13°49′36″S 76°16′22″W

Paracas Bay is a bay in the Department of Ica, Peru. With its southern end lying within the Paracas National Reservation, the bay is well known for its abundant wildlife. The unique ecosystem, insulated from thrashing ocean waves and current by Paracas Peninsula, and its shallow warmer waters, stimulates a remarkable growth of seaweed for which much of the wildlife, particularly the birds of Paracas, thrive upon directly or indirectly.

The bay appears as the gateway to Paracas National Reserve, its warmer shallow waters foster wildlife and many nautical sports, and its calm shoreline protects the municipality of Paracas and the various cottages and hotels that have sprung up in the last few years. As of recent years, the bay has hosted many sailors on catamarans and kitesurfers seeking the flat water and strong wind found in the bay.

Hotel Paracas was established in 1944 and is now a notable resort for the Peruvian elite.
