= Cachiche =

- Village
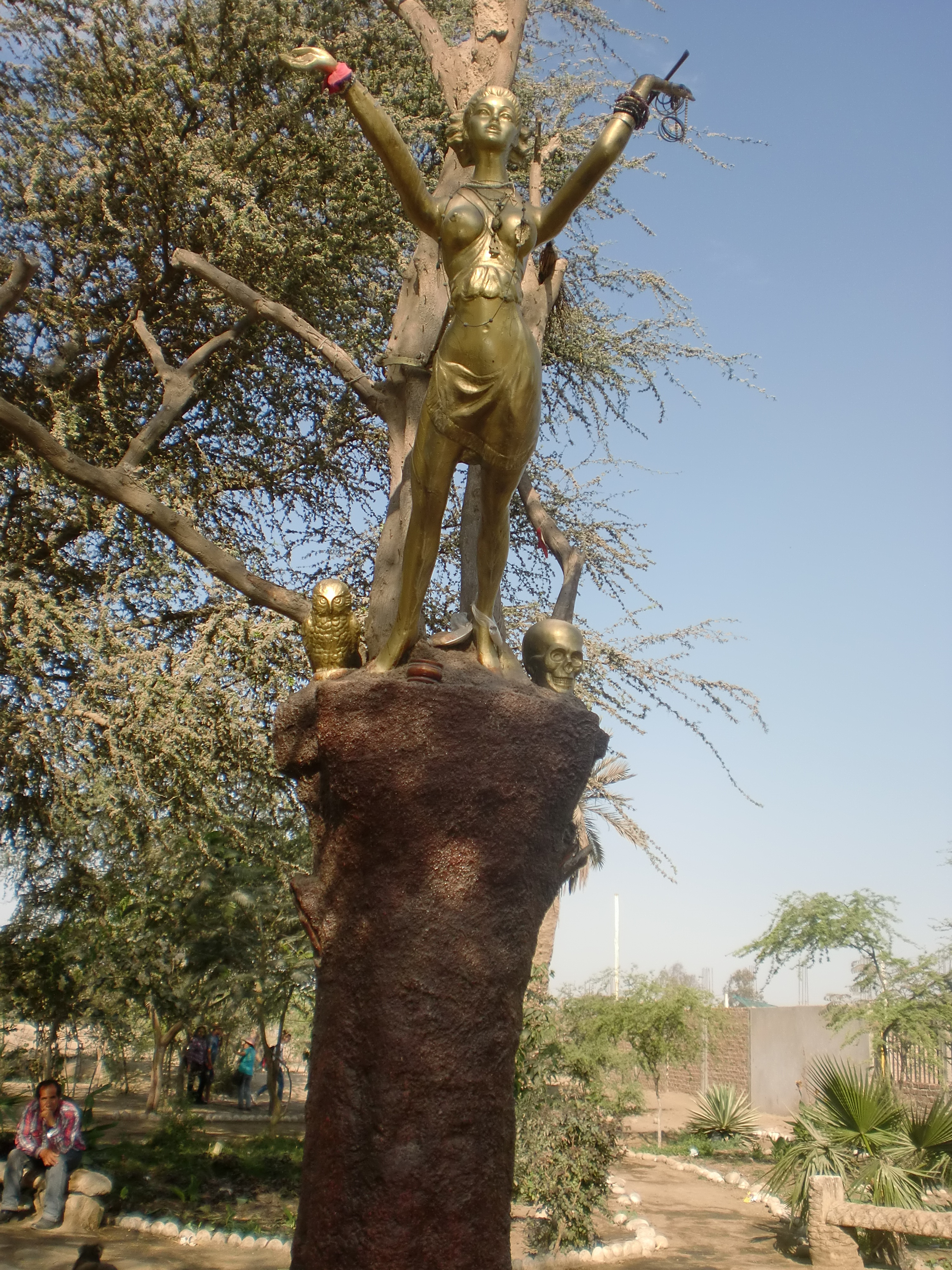
- Nickname: Witches' village
- Interactive map of Cachiche
- Coordinates: 14°05′42″S 75°44′10″W
- Country: Peru
- Region: Ica Region
- Province: Ica Province
- Time zone: UTC-5 (PET)

Cachiche is a community located just four kilometers from Ica, Peru that is known for an interest with witchcraft.

== History ==
This village owes much of its current fame to the Spanish Inquisition of the early modern age. During the Inquisition, several women accused of being witches were hunted down for their pagan beliefs. Some of these women escaped to Lima, however, they found themselves unsafe even there. The women then moved further south to the Ica valley and settled in the village of Cachiche. In the 1980s, renewed interest in Peru about alternative medicine brought this village back from being forgotten.

== Legend of Julia Hernández Pecho Viuda de Díaz ==
According to local legend, one of the most famous witches of Cachiche was Julia Hernández Pecho Viuda de Díaz. She was known to have cured the stammer of local boy named Fernando Leon de Vivero, who later became a congressman in Lima. Tell the story, when he returned to Cachiche, he wanted to show his gratitude, so he set up a statue in form a woman with her hands stretched upward in the form of a V with both an owl and a skull at each of her sides carved out of a single huarango tree, nowadays you can visit. It popular story said that in 1987 at the age 106 Julia witch dies. On her death, this famous witch prophesied that then the seventh head of the palm tree appeared, Ica would be wiped out. The story was forgotten by long time, but in 1997 (an El Niño year) torrential rains was inundating the city. The people decided to cut off the tree's seventh head but the flooding stopped before they did so. This palm tree is located in the centre of the village and the local people said that once upon a time it was a normal, erect tree, but under influence diabolic rituals performed nearby it has become deformed.
