= Regional Government of Ica =

Regional government in Peru

- Gobierno Regional de Ica

Regional Government overview
- Formed: January 1, 2003; 22 years ago
- Jurisdiction: Department of Ica
- Website: Government site

The Regional Government of Ica (Spanish: Gobierno Regional de Ica; GORE Ica) is the regional government that represents the Department of Ica. It is the body with legal identity in public law and its own assets, which is in charge of the administration of provinces of the department in Peru. Its purpose is the social, cultural and economic development of its constituency. It is based in the city of Ica.

== List of representatives ==
Governor	Political party	Period
Manuel Tello Céspedes	APRA	January 1, 2003–December 31, 2006
Rómulo Triveño	Partido Regional de Integración	January 1, 2007–December 31, 2010
Alonso Navarro	Frente Regional Progresista Iqueño	January 1, 2011–December 31, 2014
Fernando Cillóniz	Fuerza Popular	January 1, 2015–December 31, 2018
Javier Gallegos	Movimiento Regional Obras por la Modernidad	January 1, 2019–December 31, 2022
Jorge Hurtado	Movimiento Regional Uno por Ica	January 1, 2023–Incumbent

== See also ==
- Regional Governments of Peru
- Department of Ica
