= San Clemente District =

Coordinates: 13°40′51″S 76°09′27″W

San Clemente
- District
- Interactive map of San Clemente
- Country: Peru
- Region: Ica
- Province: Pisco
- Founded: June 4, 1985
- Capital: San Clemente

Government
  - Mayor: Cleto Marcelino Rojas Paucar

Area
  - Total: 127.22 km^{2} (49.12 sq mi)
- Elevation: 70 m (230 ft)

Population (2005 census)
  - Total: 17,351
  - Density: 136.39/km^{2} (353.24/sq mi)
- Time zone: UTC-5 (PET)
- UBIGEO: 110507

San Clemente District is one of eight districts of the province Pisco in Peru.
