= Tupac Amaru Inca District =

Coordinates: 13.7134°S 76.1491°W

Tupac Amaru Inca Tupaq Amaru Inka
- District
- Interactive map of Tupac Amaru Inca
- Country: Peru
- Region: Ica
- Province: Pisco
- Founded: June 6, 1986
- Capital: Tupac Amaru

Government
  - Mayor: Tomas Villanueva Andia Crisostomo

Area
  - Total: 55.48 km^{2} (21.42 sq mi)
- Elevation: 70 m (230 ft)

Population (2005 census)
  - Total: 11,742
  - Density: 211.6/km^{2} (548.2/sq mi)
- Time zone: UTC-5 (PET)
- UBIGEO: 110508

Tupac Amaru Inca District is one of eight districts of the province Pisco in Peru.
