= Paracas District =

Paracas
- District
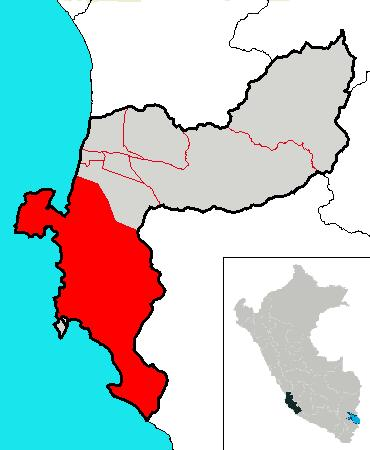
- Location of Paracas in the Pisco province
- Coordinates: 13°42′45.12″S 76°12′28.56″W
- Country: Peru
- Region: Ica
- Province: Pisco
- Founded: March 8, 1951
- Capital: Paracas

Area
  - Total: 1,440.68 km^{2} (556.25 sq mi)
- Elevation: 2 m (6.6 ft)

Population (2005 census)
  - Total: 1,252
  - Density: 0.8690/km^{2} (2.251/sq mi)
- Time zone: UTC-5 (PET)
- UBIGEO: 110505

Paracas District is one of eight districts of the province Pisco in Peru.
