= Paracas culture =

Archaeological culture of Peru

Paracas
- Area of development and influence of the Paracas culture.
- Period: Early Horizon
- Dates: c. 800 BCE – 100 BCE
- Major sites: Paracas Candelabra
- Followed by: Nazca culture

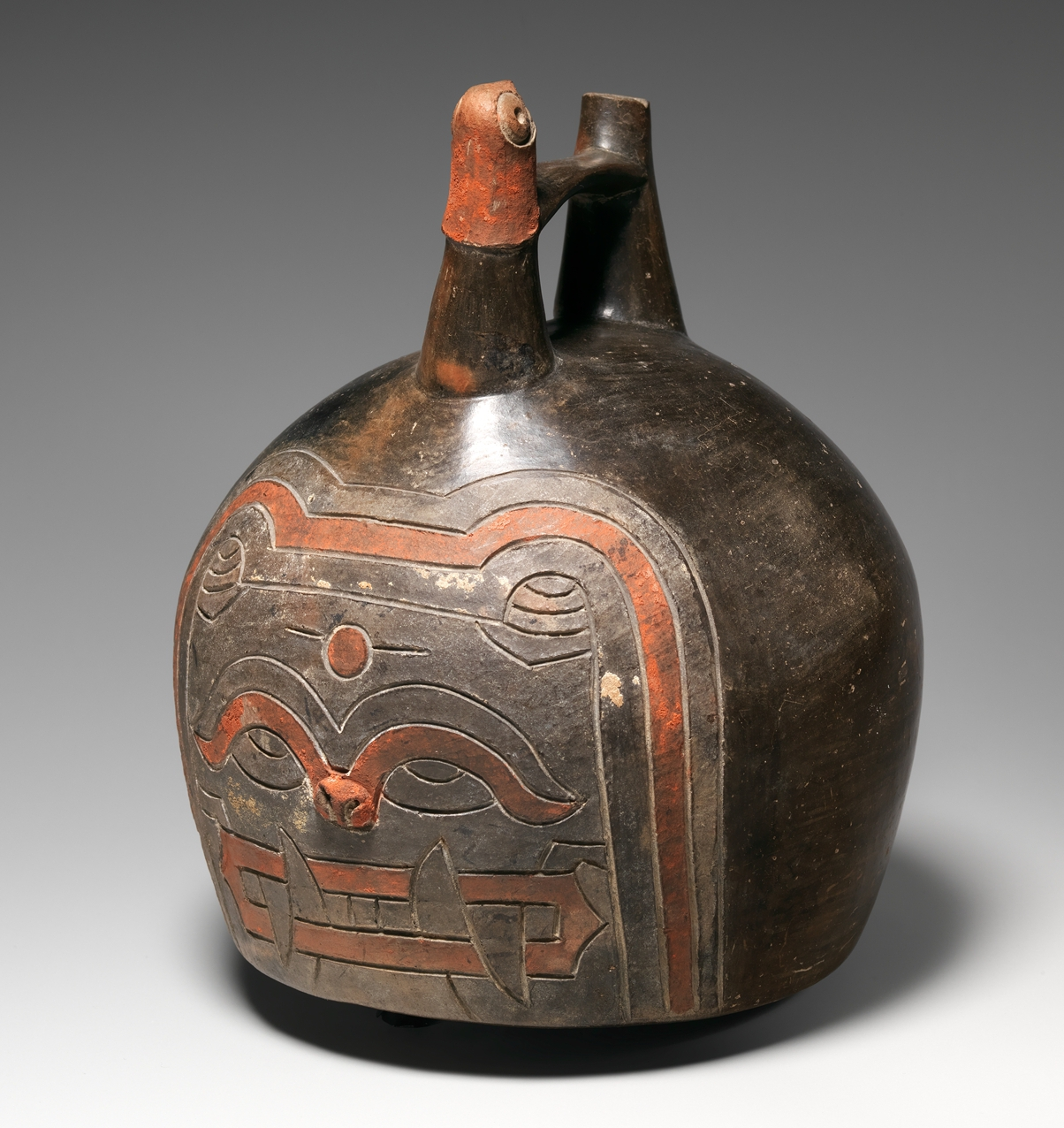
Ceramic Bottle with Feline Face, 4th–3rd century BCE. The face of a snarling feline decorates the side of the vessel chamber, directly under the whistle spout.

The Paracas culture was an Andean society existing between approximately 800 BCE and 100 BCE, located in what today is the Ica Region of Peru. The Paracas people had extensive knowledge of irrigation and water management and made significant contributions in the textile arts. Most of the information about the lives of the Paracas people comes from excavations at the large seaside Paracas site on the Paracas Peninsula, first formally investigated in the 1920s by Peruvian archaeologist Julio Tello.

The Paracas Cavernas are shaft tombs set into the top of Cerro Colorado, each containing multiple burials. There is evidence that over the centuries when the culture thrived, these tombs were reused. In some cases, the heads of the deceased were taken out, apparently for rituals, and later reburied. The associated ceramics include incised polychrome, "negative" resist decoration, and other wares of the Paracas tradition. The associated textiles include many complex weave structures, as well as elaborate plaiting and knotting techniques.

The necropolis of Wari Kayan consisted of two clusters of hundreds of burials set closely together inside and around abandoned buildings on the steep north slope of Cerro Colorado. The associated ceramics are very fine plain wares, some with white and red slips, others with pattern-burnished decoration, and other wares of the Topara tradition. Each burial consisted of a conical textile-wrapped bundle, most containing a seated individual facing north across the bay of Paracas, next to grave offerings such as ceramics, foodstuffs, baskets, and weapons. Each body was bound with cord to hold it in a seated position, before being wrapped in many layers of intricate, ornate, and finely woven textiles. The Paracas Necropolis textiles and embroideries are considered to be some of the finest ever produced by Pre-Columbian Andean societies. They are the primary works of art by which Paracas culture is known. Burials at the necropolis of Wari Kayan continued until approximately 250 CE. Many of the mortuary bundles include textiles similar to those of the early Nazca culture, which arose after the Paracas.

== Political and social organization ==
Paracas lacked a central figurehead or government, and were instead composed of local chiefdoms. These communities were joined by shared religion and trade, but maintained economic and political autonomy. Early Paracas communities were within the Chavín sphere of interaction and formed their own versions of the cult. In the middle period (500–380 BCE) Chavín's influence on the Paracas culture dwindled and communities began to form their own unique identities. Relationships between these chiefdoms were not always peaceful, as evidence by violent battle wounds, trophy heads, and obsidian knives found at Paracas sites.

Subregions within the larger Paracas sphere emerged from local integration, including the Chinca Valley, the Ica Valley, and the Palpa Valley. The Chinca Valley was likely the political center of Paracas culture, with the Paracas Peninsula possibly acting primarily as burial grounds and Ica being a peripheral zone of Chincha. Chincha has numerous roads, geoglyphs, and religious centers that would have served as a ritual meeting point. People would have come from both coastal and highland communities, allowing for social and political integration as well as economic exchange. Large mounds were built for ceremonial purposes throughout the valley, however there is little evidence for permanent occupation at these sites; instead, agriculture and fishing occurred in the land surrounding mounds and ritual complexes. The valley has extensive irrigation systems to increase agricultural production, a trait found throughout Paracas settlements and monumental sites.

The site Cerro del Gentil in the Upper Chincha Valley dates to approximately 550–200 BCE and was used to host feasts for people throughout the Paracas sphere of influence. Though one of the smaller sites in the valley, it has still been subject to intensive research and is useful for understanding the political evolution of Paracas. The site is composed of a monumental platform mound with two sunken courts surrounded by agricultural fields. Strontium isotope testing of offerings at the site shows that people came from long distances to feast, suggesting that distant alliances were built initially and intentionally rather than consolidating local alliances first. A termination ritual occurred at the site around 200 BCE, in which large amounts of pottery, baskets, and other offerings were made along with a large feast. The high variability of offerings at the site, including bird feathers from far northern Peru, again show the variety of individuals using the site.

=== Decline and the Paracas/Nazca transition ===
Nazca Culture and iconography are believed by scholars such as Helaine Silverman to have evolved from Paracas culture. Nazca had shared religion with the Paracas, and continued the traditions of textile making, head-hunting, and warfare in early phases. Hendrik Van Gijseghem notes that Paracas remains in the Río Grande de Nazca drainage, the heartland of Nazca culture, are limited. In contrast, there are abundant Paracas remains in the Ica, Pisco, and Chincha valleys, as well as the Bahía de la Independencia. He noted that the southern Nazca region, which became the most populous region of its culture, was never an important area of Paracas occupation. He believes that initial settlement of the region by Paracas populations and subsequent population growth mark the beginning of Nazca society.

Many Paracas sites were later inhabited by the Topará tradition, and the decline of the Paracas culture is often thought to be associated with the "invasion" of the Topará culture the north at approximately 150 BCE. This is largely based on Topará-style ceramics found at late Paracas and initial Nazca sites. However, this theory has recently been called into question; the termination ritual at Cerro del Gentil and other Chincha Valley sites precedes any Topará occupation, and the sites show no sign of resistance to an invading culture. Radiocarbon dates show that the earliest accepted Topará site, Jahuay, was first occupied ~165 years after the closure of Cerro del Gentil. This suggests that the decline of Paracas and the Paracas-Nazca transition was already underway when the Topará tradition emerged.

== Ceramics ==
Paracas ceramics is distinguishable from the Topará culture and Paracas-Nazca transition as a result of the difference in the slip used to create and decorate the ceramic pieces. The Topará ceramic style is dominated by monochromatic designs, often decorated with an orange or neutral color clay slip. Nazca ceramics involved a focus on polychrome designs accomplished through the application of a slip consisting of clay and pigments obtained from minerals like manganese found in their environment. The Paracas ceramic style involved the application of a clay based slip before firing the polychrome ceramic pieces. Though the Paracas culture often employed post-fire painting, a technique that involves markings and decorations through the application of resin and pigment to produce the colorful pieces that set apart Paracas from the Topará and Nazca. Alongside the culturally significant polychrome aspect of Paracas ceramics, this culture involved geometric, zoomorphic, and anthropomorphic foci with evidence of an abstract style. Paracas ceramics had abstract forms, showing architectural features through the configuration of form and imagery of Paracas ceramics to illustrate cultural and historical aspects of the Paracas culture.

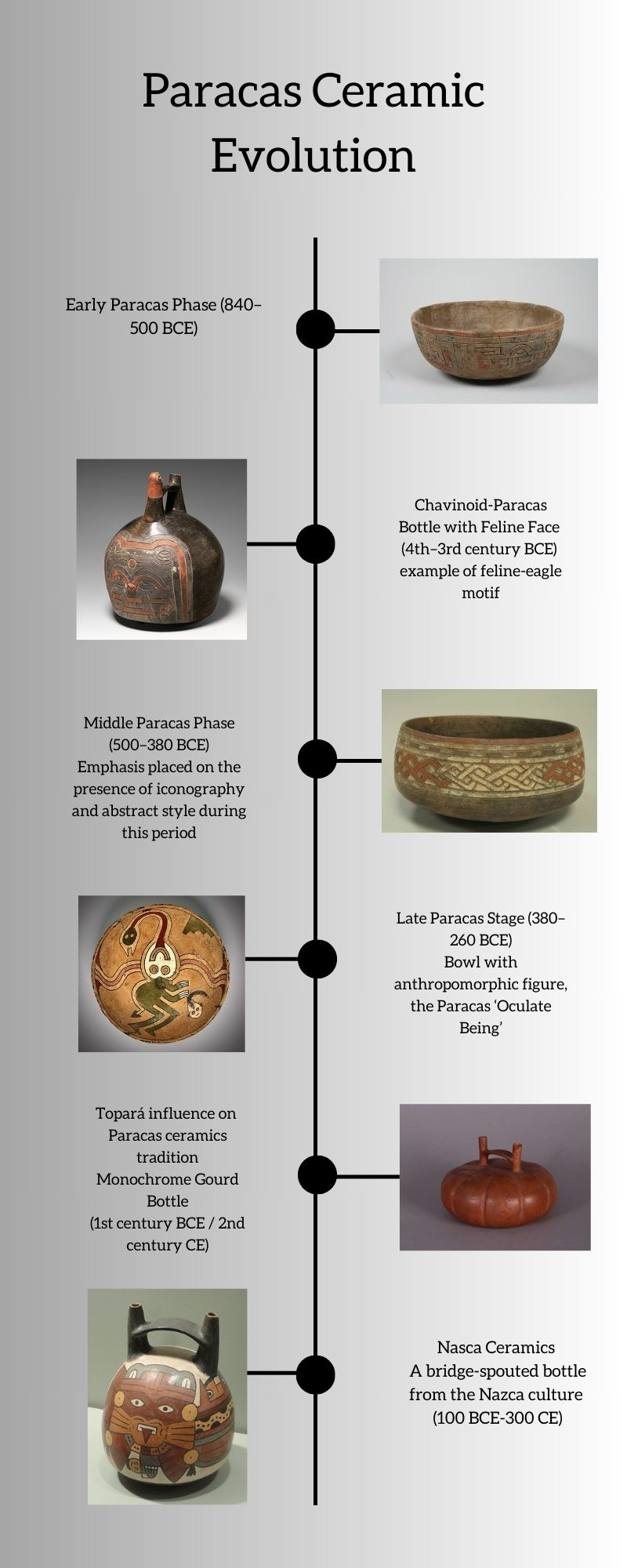
Timeline signifying the evolution of Paracas Ceramics.

Ceremonial burial was of great significance in the Paracas culture. The identification of specific burial sites prompted a chronology ordering of the material art found in the burial complexes. Paracas Cavernas, Paracas Necropolis and Ocucaje are burial complexes on the southern Peruvian coast constructed about 2,000 years ago. The Paracas ceramic style is specifically associated with the Cavernas and Ocucaje burials and the Topará with the Necropolis burials with a slight presence at the Ocucaje burial complex. The transition from Paracas ceramic style to that of the Nazca culture was marked and identified at the Ocucaje. These specific burial locations facilitated the emergence of phases to sequence Paracas ceramic development.

The first phase (840-500 BCE) signified the early period of Paracas ceramics that were located along the coast or in valleys. This phase consisted of ceramics from Ocucaje and influenced by the Chavín culture given the presence of chavinoid features. The Paracas emerged separate from the Chavín culture and decidedly included specific aspects of Chavín material art like the feline-eagle motif that was similar to the falcon frieze of the Black and White Portal located at Chavín de Huántar, a Pre-Incan ceremonial site in the highlands of Peru, a center for the Chavín culture. A recurring feature in Paracas ceramics involved the representation of a full face feline.

The middle Paracas period (500–380 BCE) included the time spent constructing the Paracas culture, which is distinctive from Chavín culture. In this period, the Paracas expanded trade networks and continued to build their religious framework that supported the building of burials consisting of a large number of ceramics. The late Paracas phase (380–260 BCE) was linked with the homogenization of Paracas ceramics and the influx of people visiting the huacas in the southern coast of Peru. This period involved the growing presence of the "Oculate Being," a creature that was a major part of the Inca valley.

The sequence of these stages enables for analysis of the imagery and colorants used to decorate Paracas ceramics. However, the accessibility and use of pigments varied across different regions in the Incan Valley. At Ocucaje, the early and middle phases of Paracas ceramics consisted of pigments (mostly red and green) that were rich in iron. The late phase showed the Paracas culture moved away from iron-base paints. Paracas ceramics in the late style was marked by the presence of less vibrant colors and more of a neutral color palette, marking a transition in Paracas ceramic style.

== Mummy bundles ==
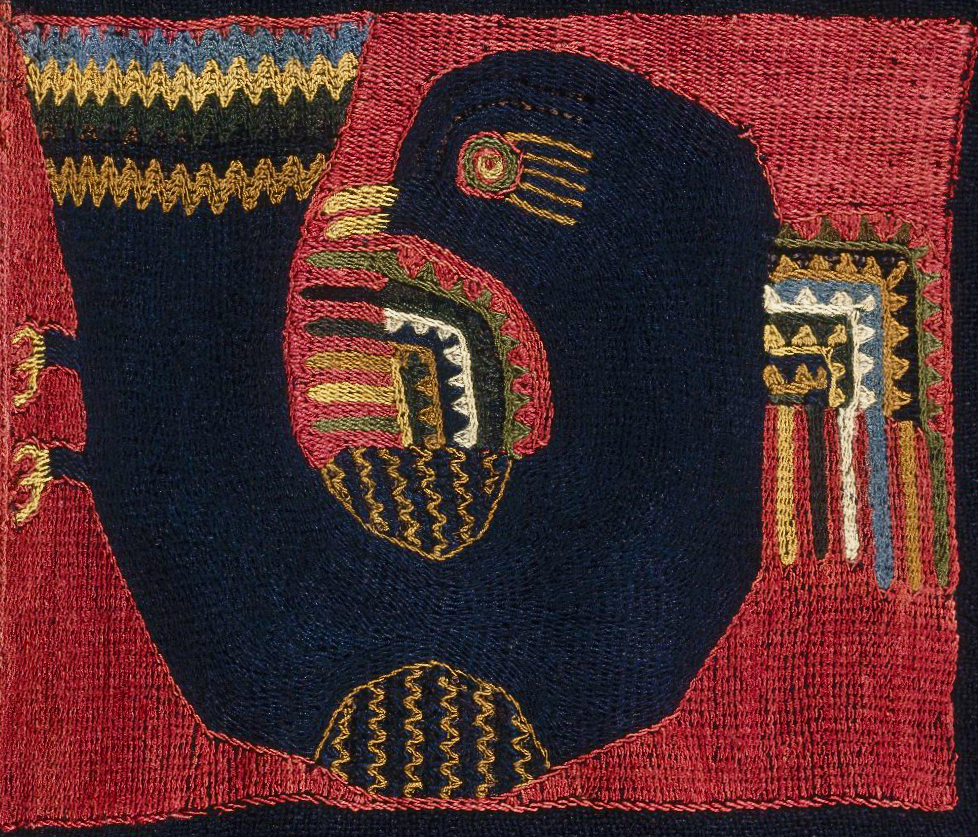
Detail, Falcon on the Brooklyn Paracas mantle, 0-100 C.E. Brooklyn Museum.

The dry environment of southern Peru's Pacific coast allows organic materials to be preserved when buried. Mummified human remains were found in a tomb in the Paracas peninsula of Peru, buried under layers of cloth textiles. The dead were wrapped in layers of cloth called "mummy bundles". These bodies were found at the Great Paracas Necropolis along the south Pacific coast of the Andes. At the Necropolis there were two large clusters of crowded pit tombs, totaling about 420 bodies, dating to around 300–200 BCE. The mummified bodies in each tomb were wrapped in textiles. The textiles would have required many hours of work as the plain wrappings were very large and the clothing was finely woven and embroidered. The larger mummy bundles had many layers of bright colored garments and headdresses. Sheet gold and shell bead jewelry was worn by both men and women, and some were tattooed. The shape of these mummy bundles has been compared to a seed, or a human head.

The textiles and jewelry in the tombs and mummy bundles attracted looters. Once discovered, the Paracas Necropolis was looted heavily between the years 1931 and 1933, during the Great Depression, particularly in the Wari Kayan section. The amount of stolen materials is not known; however, Paracas textiles began to appear on the international market in the following years. It is believed the majority of Paracas textiles outside of the Andes were smuggled out of Peru.

== Textiles ==
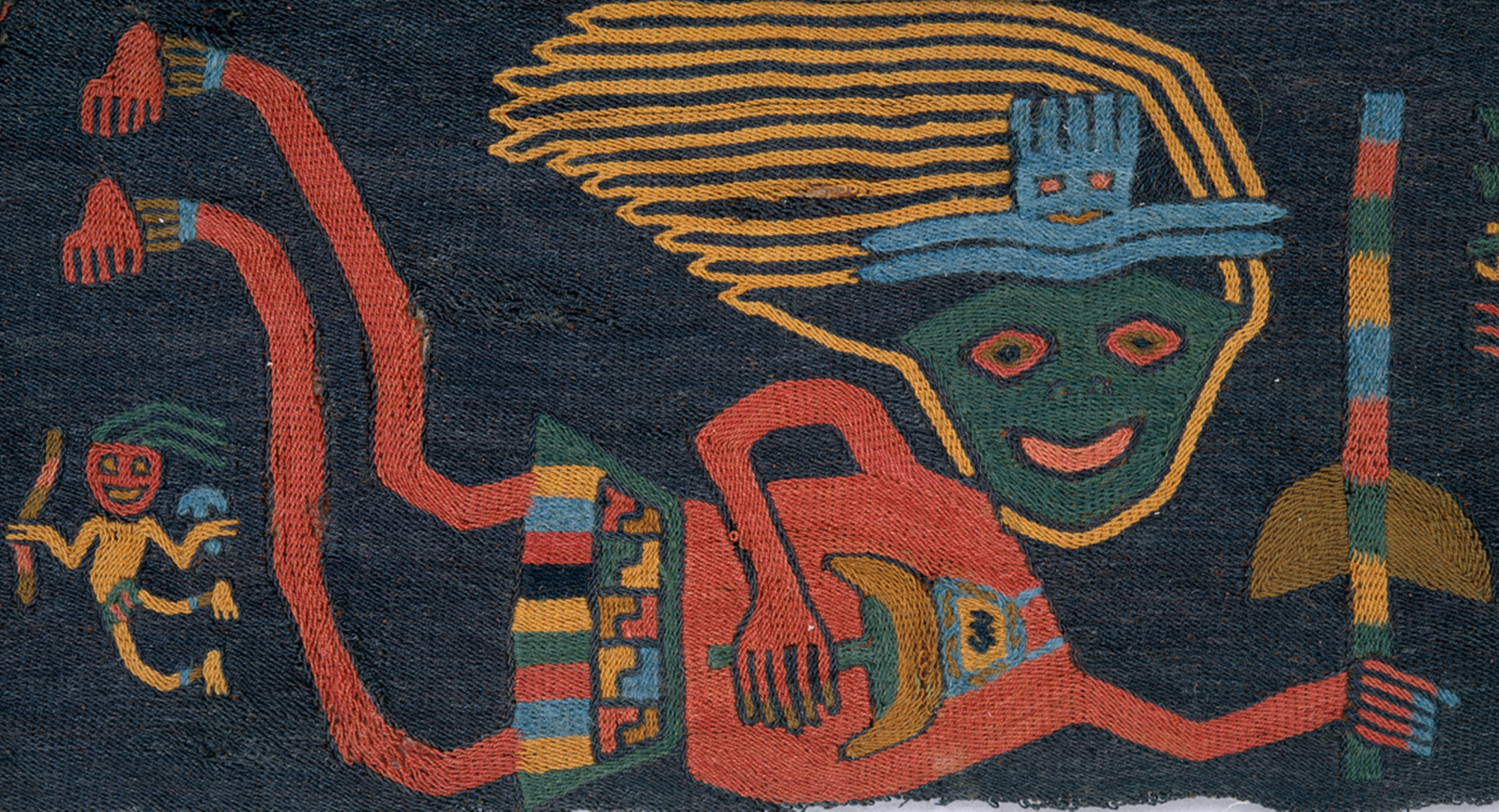
Paracas border, flying man detail. This is a famous motif from the Paracas Necropolis burial textiles. Dates to 450–175 BCE but it is in pristine condition. The field of view is about 10 inches (25.4 cm) wide. The entire textile can be viewed at Metropolitan Museum website

According to Anne Paul, this shape could have been a conscious choice by the people, with the seed a symbol of rebirth. Paul also suggests that the detail and high quality of the textiles found in the mummy bundles show that these fabrics were used for important ceremonial purposes. Both native Andean cotton and the hair of camelids like the wild vicuña and domestic llama or alpaca come in many natural colors. Yarns were also dyed in a wide range of hues, used together in loom weaving and many other techniques. This combination of materials shows trading relationships with other communities at lower and higher elevations.

The imagery found on these textiles included ceremonial practices. Some depicted a fallen figure, or possibly flying. Some figures appear to have face paint, and hold a severed head, also called trophy heads. Victims' heads were severed and collected during battles or raids. Possibly, the head of a person was considered their life force, the place in the body where the spirit was located. Not only did these textiles show important symbols of the Paracas cosmology, it is thought that they were worn to establish gender, social standing, authority, and indicate the community in which one resided.

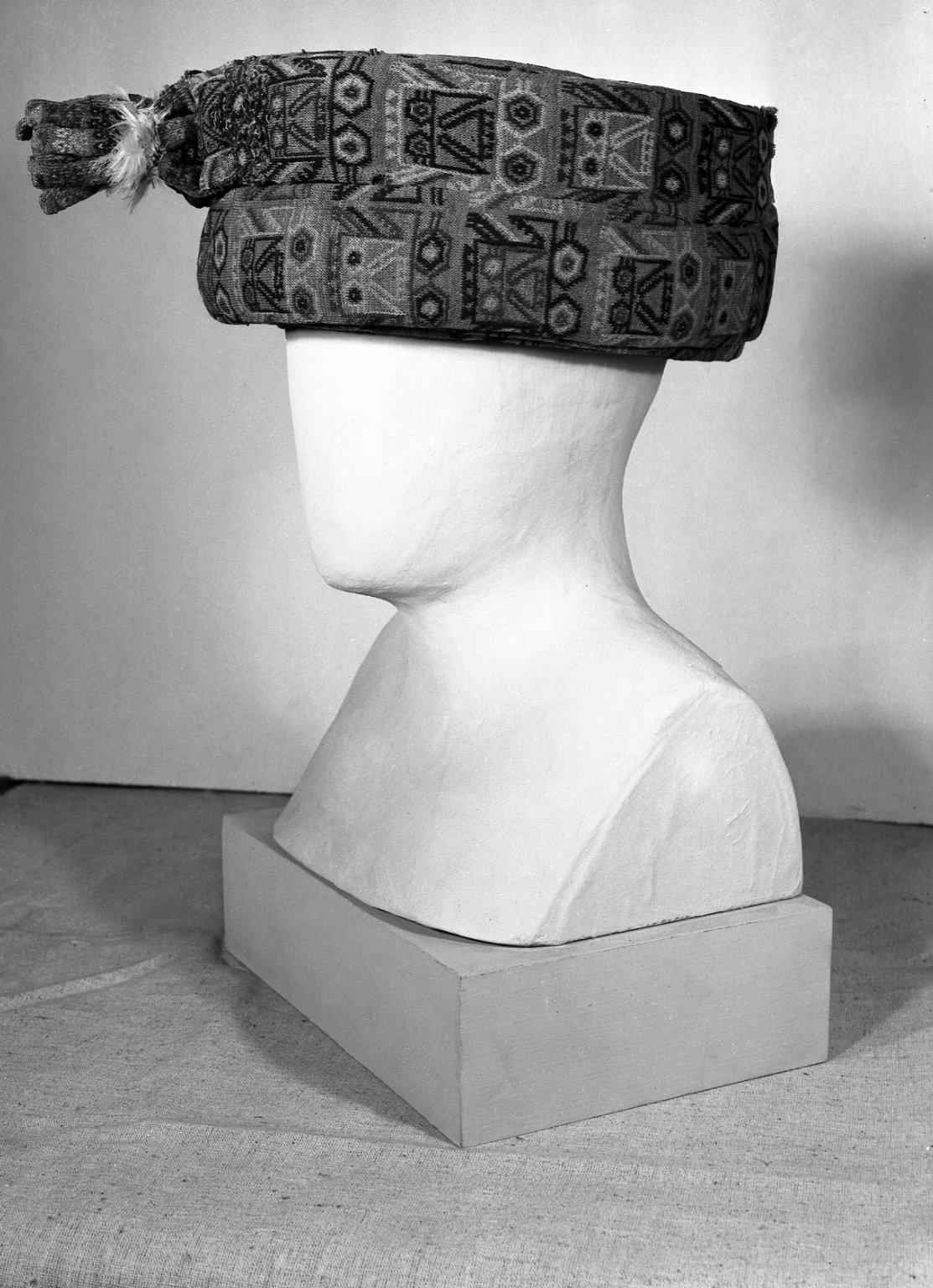
Turban, Paracas, 300 BCE – 100 CE Brooklyn Museum

Different color schemes characterize the textiles of Paracas Cavernas, early Paracas Necropolis and later Nazca-related styles. The dyes used came from many regions of the Andes and are an example of reciprocity, as people from different altitudes traded with one another for different goods. The color red comes from the cochineal bug found on the prickly pear cactus. The cochineal was ground up with mortar and pestle to create a red pigment. Yellow dyes could be made from the qolle tree and quico flowers, while orange dyes can be extracted from beard lichen (Usnea). For the color green the most common plant used is the cg'illca, mixed with a mineral called collpa. While blues are created from a tara, the deeper a hue of blue, the more the mineral collpa was added. The process of creating dyes could take up to several hours. Then it could take another two hours for women to boil and dye the fibers. This work was followed by spinning and weaving the fibers.

The woven textiles of Paracas were made on backstrap looms generally in solid color. These webs were richly ornamented with embroidery in two different styles. The earlier linear style embroidery was done in running stitches closely following the furrows of the weaving itself. Red, green, gold and blue color was used to delineate nested animal figures, which emerge from the background with upturned mouths, while the stitching creates the negative space. These embroideries are highly abstracted and difficult to interpret. The later used Block-color style embroidery was made with stem stitches outlining and solidly filling curvilinear figures in a large variety of vivid colors. The therianthropomorphic figures are illustrated with great detail with systematically varied coloring.

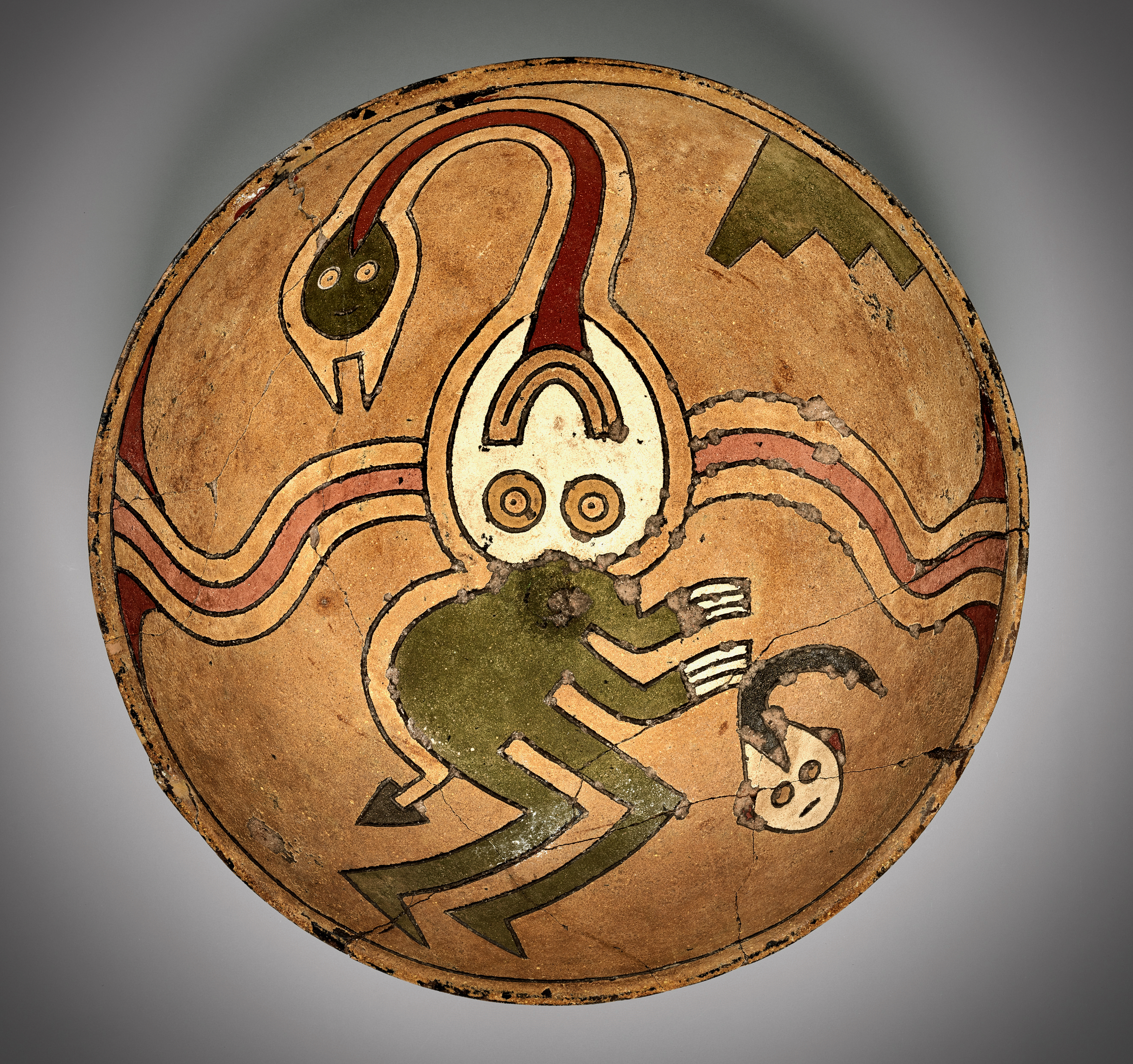
Oculate Being, Paracas culture. 350 BCE–60 CE. Metropolitan Museum, NYC.

== Cranial modification ==
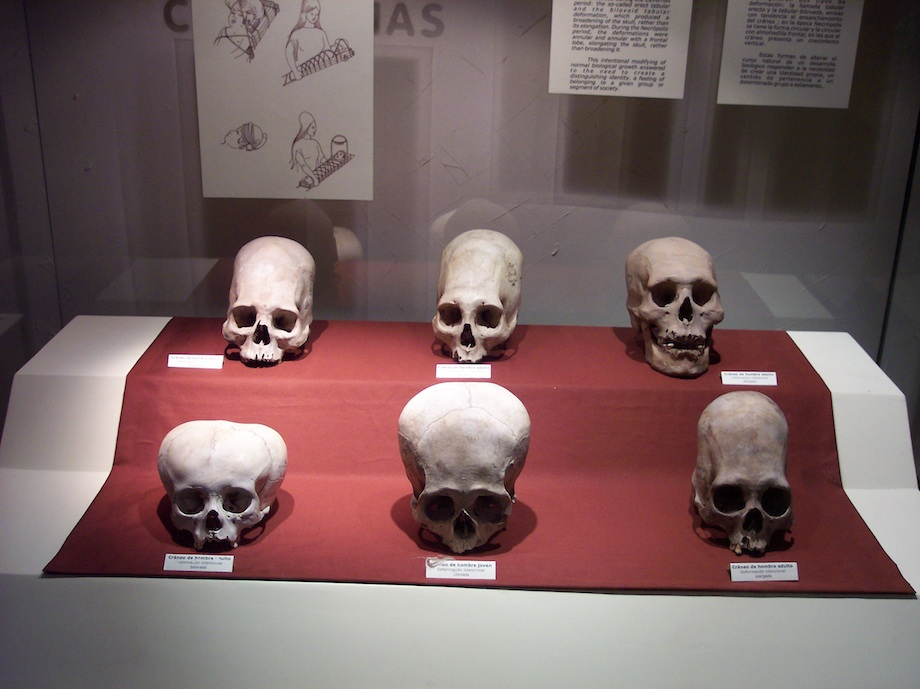
A set of Paracas culture skulls that show a range of different types of cranial modification. The two skulls from the left of the front row are Bilobate.

=== Artificial cranial deformation ===
Like many ancient Andean societies, the Paracas culture participated in artificial cranial deformation. Of the excavated and accessible skulls from the Paracas Cavernas, the vast majority of skulls were visibly modified. The skulls were observed to be primarily of two shapes: Tabular Erect or Bilobate. Though Tabular Erect was the most common among both sexes, Bilobate skulls were observed at a much higher rate in female skulls. This association with sex has evidence in some Paracas ceramics, where men and women are depicted with distinctly Tabular Erect and Bilobate heads, respectively.

Some archaeologists suggest that Andean conceptions of gender and cosmovision could support a quadripartite (masculine–masculine, masculine–feminine, feminine–masculine and feminine–feminine) construction of gender that could explain the decisions of alteration type per sex. Cranial modification shape appears not to be tied to social status (based on burial goods), or kinship (based on groupings of remains).

=== Trepanation ===
The Paracas culture also shows evidence of the earliest trepanations in the Americas, using lithic scraping and drilling techniques to remove sections of the skull. The likely motivation for trepanation may have been to treat the depressed skull fractures that are commonly observed in Paracas culture remains, likely caused by the slings, clubs, and atlatls commonly found in mummy bundles along the south Peruvian coast. However, many of the Paracas trepanations remove such a large amount of the skull that direct evidence of skull fractures or similar injuries coinciding with trepanation is elusive. Observed trepanations and skull fractures are both most common on the front of the skull, lending indirect support to an association between the two.

Based on the level of bone reaction and healing observed in a trepanned skull, archaeologists can estimate the survival rate of these medical procedures: 39% of patients would have died during trepanation or shortly after (with no bone reaction being observed), and nearly 40% of patients would have survived long-term (with extensive bone reaction being observed). Currently, the best estimate of the frequency of trepanations in the Paracas culture is around 40%, though sampling bias in the initial selection of skulls, the large quantity of unopened mummy bundles, and the 39% mortality rate of Paracas trepanation make an estimate this high very unlikely.

== Geoglyphs ==
In 2018 RPAS drones used by archaeologists to survey cultural evidence revealed many geoglyphs in Palpa province. These are being assigned to the Paracas culture, and have been shown to predate the associated Nazca lines by a thousand years. The theorized evolution of the Paracas culture into the Nazca supports this assignment. In addition, the Paracas geoglyphs show a significant difference in subjects and locations from the Nazca lines; many are constructed on a hillside rather than the desert valley floor. Archaeologist Luis Jaime Castillo notes that this difference has very practical effects: the Nazca lines would not have been easily viewed, intended for the gods, while the Paracas geoglyphs could have been easily viewed by humans, and their representational figures were potentially used to demarcate territory.
