= Paracas National Reserve =

Protected area in Ica department, Peru

- Reserva Nacional de Paracas
- IUCN category VI (protected area with sustainable use of natural resources)
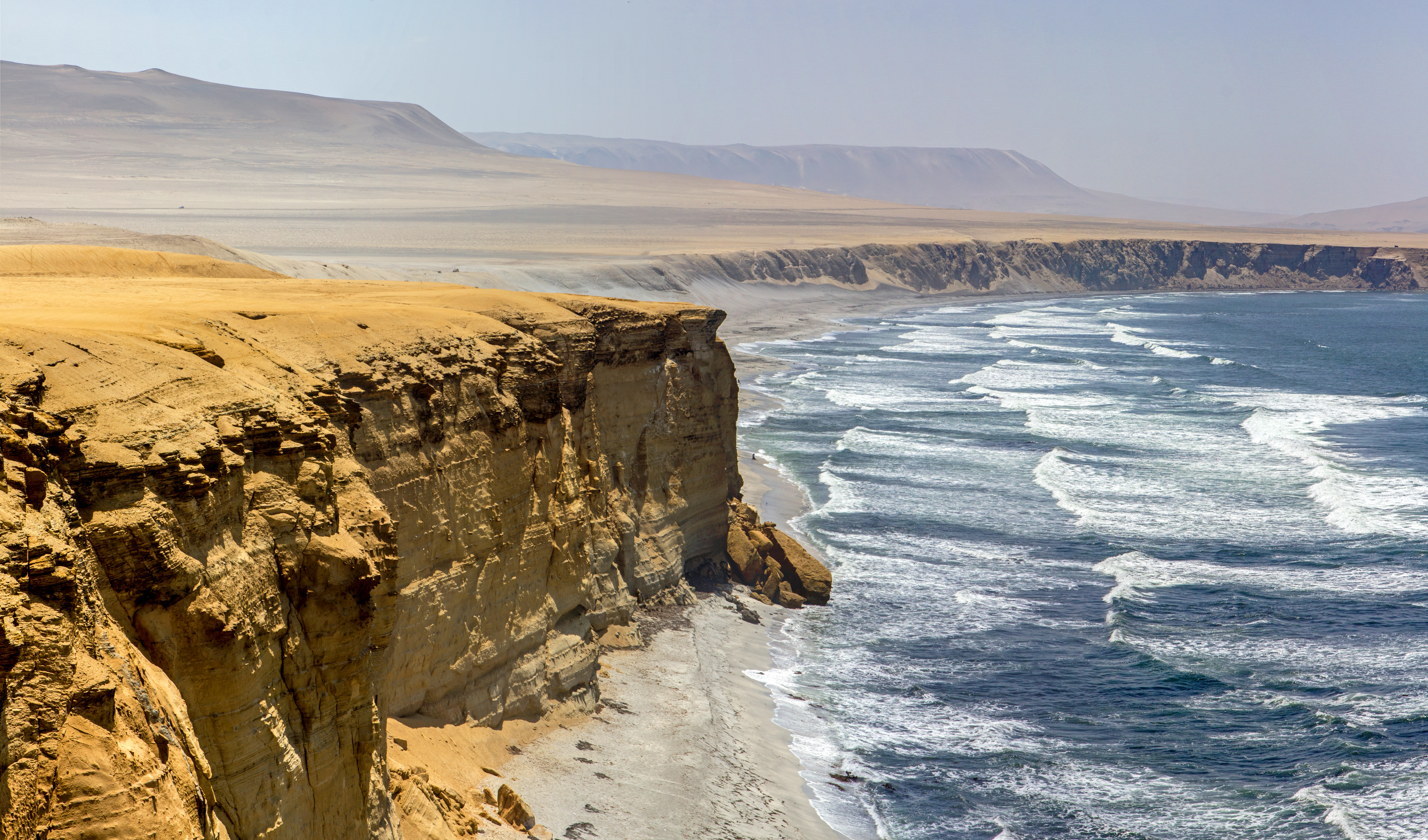
- Supay beach, at Paracas National Reserve

- Location within Peru
- Location: Peru; Ica
- Nearest city: Pisco
- Coordinates: 13°53′43.5″S 76°16′15.9″W
- Area: 3,350 km^{2} (1,290 sq mi)
- Established: 25 September 1975
- Governing body: SERNANP
- Website: Reserva Nacional de Paracas (in Spanish)

Ramsar Wetland
- Official name: Paracas
- Designated: 30 March 1992
- Reference no.: 545

Paracas National Reserve is a protected area in the region of Ica, Peru and protects desert and marine ecosystems for their conservation and sustainable use. There are also archaeological remains of the Paracas culture inside the reserve.

== Geography ==
The reserve is located in the region of Ica, 250 km south of Lima, and a few kilometres from the town of Pisco. It spans an area of 335,000 hectares, 65% of which correspond to marine ecosystems. The highest elevation in the reserve is 786 m (2,579 ft).

The reserve includes coastal geographic features such as the Paracas Peninsula, Independencia Bay, San Gallán Island, Paracas Bay and Independencia Island.

== Climate ==
Pisco

Climate chart (precipitation, max. and min. temperature)
J	F	M	A	M	J	J	A	S	O	N	D
0 27 17	0 28 18	0 28 18	0 26 16	0 24 14	0 21 13	0 21 12	0 21 12	1 21 12	0 22 13	0 23 14	0 25 16
- █ Average max. and min. temperatures in °C
- █ Precipitation totals in mm
- Source: Climate-Data.org
Imperial conversion
J	F	M	A	M	J	J	A	S	O	N	D
0 81 63	0 82 65	0 82 64	0 79 61	0 74 57	0 71 55	0 69 54	0 69 53	0 70 54	0 72 55	0 74 57	0 77 60
- █ Average max. and min. temperatures in °F
- █ Precipitation totals in inches

Paracas National Reserve is an arid zone, with intense local winds known as paracas. Precipitation is scarce and occurs in winter, falling mostly on the top of the highest hills, which is vital to the lomas ecosystem. The following climograph corresponds to the nearby town of Pisco (19 m of elevation).

== Ecology ==
=== Flora ===
Some terrestrial plant species found in the reserve are: Tiquilia paronychoides, Prosopis pallida, Distichlis spicata, Tillandsia spp., Eriosyce omasensis, Geoffroea decorticans, Sesuvium portulacastrum, Cressa truxillensis, Geranium limae, Suaeda foliosa and Oxalis carnosa.

Marine algae found in the reserve include: Ulva lactuca, Chondracanthus chamissoi, Macrocystis pyrifera and Pyropia columbina.

=== Fauna ===
The Paracas National Reserve houses a great biological diversity, especially in the marine-coastal part. It is estimated that there are about 216 species of birds, 36 of mammals, 10 of reptiles, 168 of fish and a large number of invertebrates that are an initial part of the trophic chain of this important place.

Mammals found in the reserve include: the sei whale, South American fur seal, dusky dolphin, marine otter, sperm whale, humpback whale, South American sea lion, killer whale, common bottlenose dolphin and southern right whale.

Birds found in the reserve include: the Andean condor, Chilean flamingo, spotted sandpiper, oasis hummingbird, Peruvian pelican, Inca tern, black skimmer, Humboldt penguin, guanay cormorant, Peruvian thick-knee, Andean swift and Peruvian diving petrel. The reserve has been designated an Important Bird Area (IBA) by BirdLife International because it supports significant populations of several bird species.

Molluscs found in the area include: Argopecten purpuratus, Concholepas concholepas, Thais chocolata, Fissurella maxima, Glaucus atlanticus, Choromytilus chorus and Aulacomya atra.

Fish found in the reserve include: Peruvian hake, flathead grey mullet, skipjack tuna, blue flyingfish, humpback smooth-hound, copper shark, Peruvian anchoveta, eastern Pacific bonito, Peruvian eagle ray, fine flounder, blue shark, corvina and bigeye tuna.

== Archaeology ==
There are more than 100 archaeological sites identified inside the reserve, many of them of the Paracas culture, known especially for their textile crafts.

== Recreation ==
Beach tourism and wildlife observation are the main activities in the reserve.

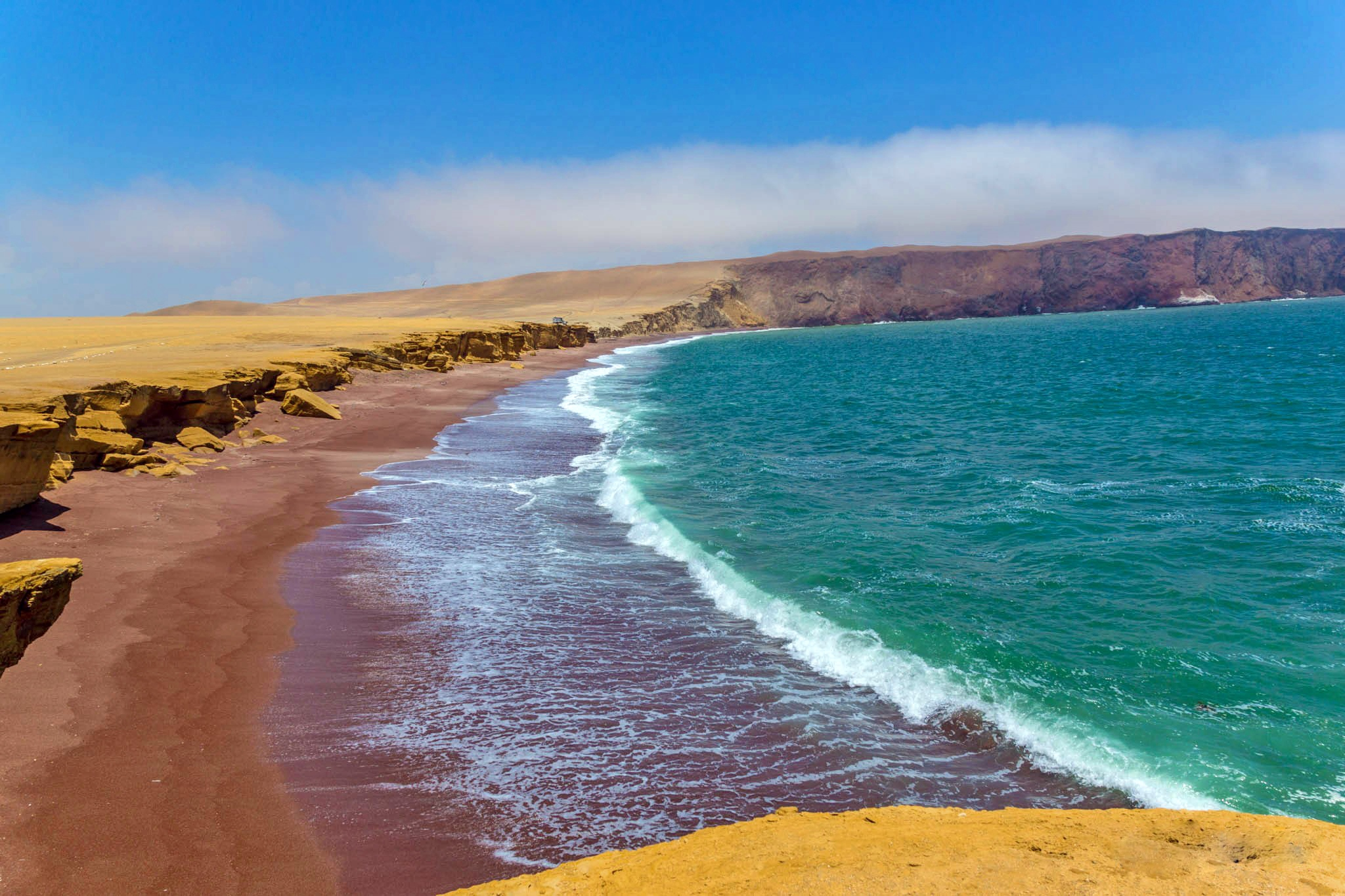
Red beach at Paracas National Reserve

== Gallery ==
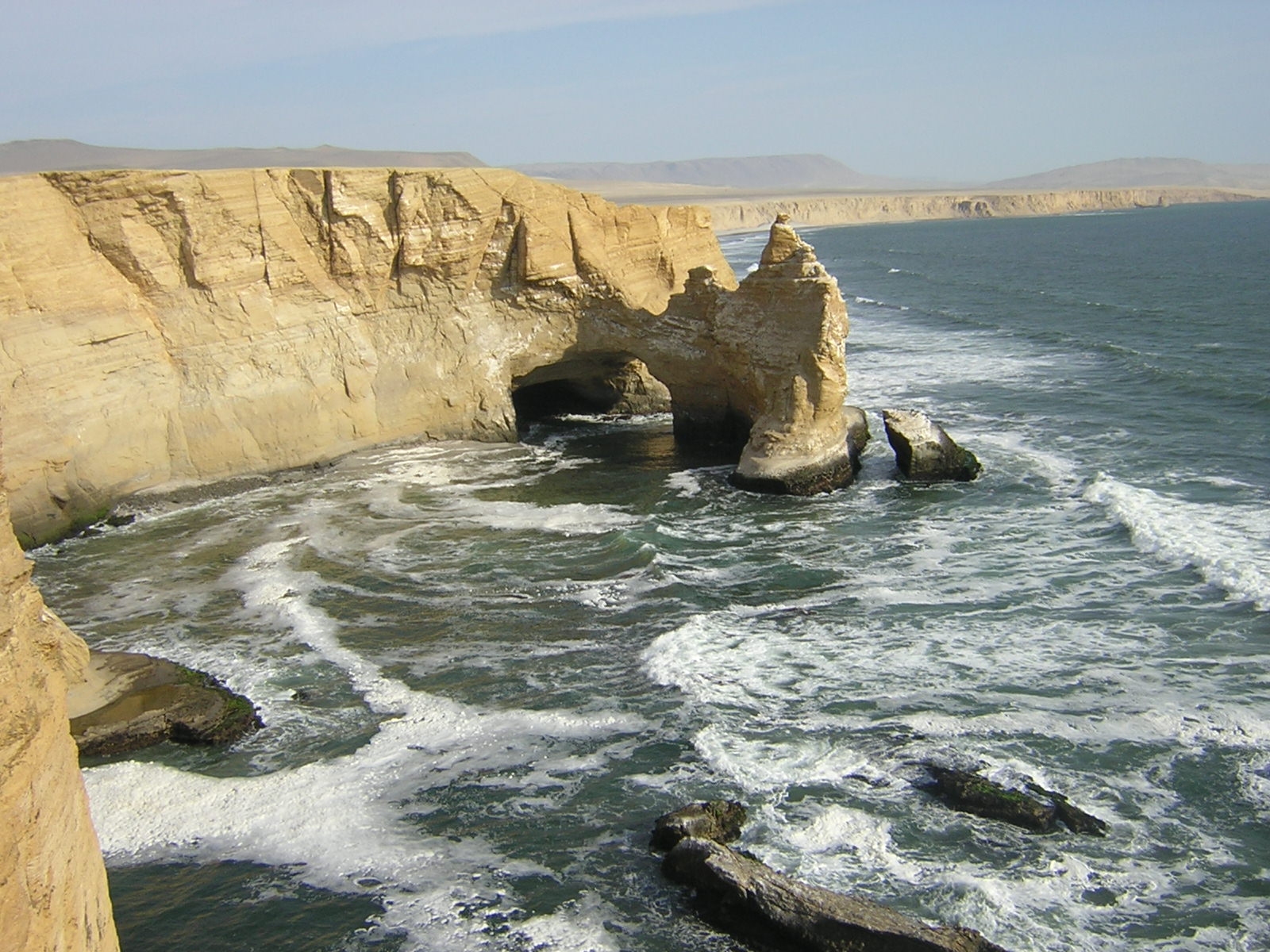
La Catedral, January 2007

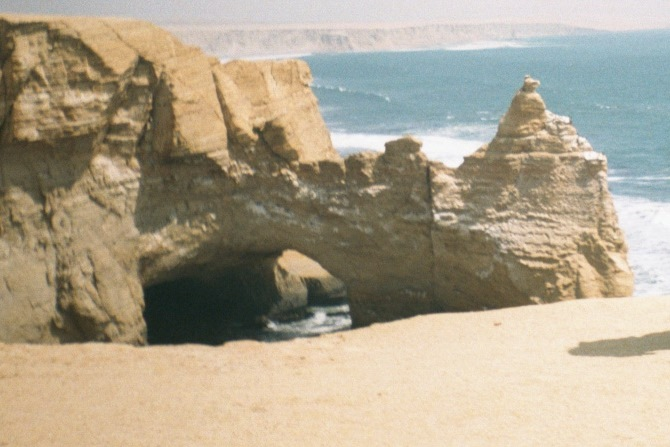
La Catedral, November 2000

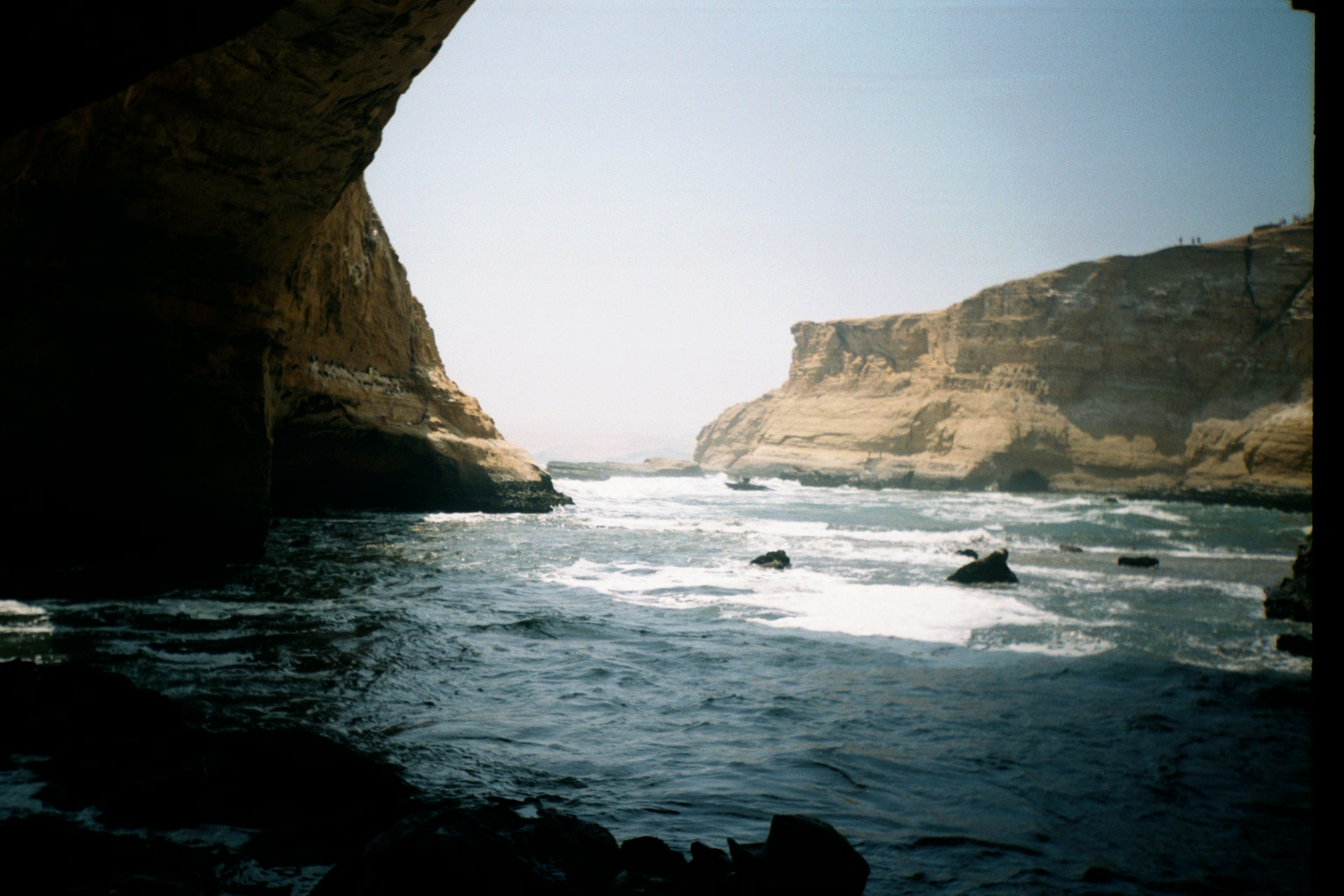
A November 2000 view from within what used to be the Cathedral cave, which was destroyed in earthquake of 2007

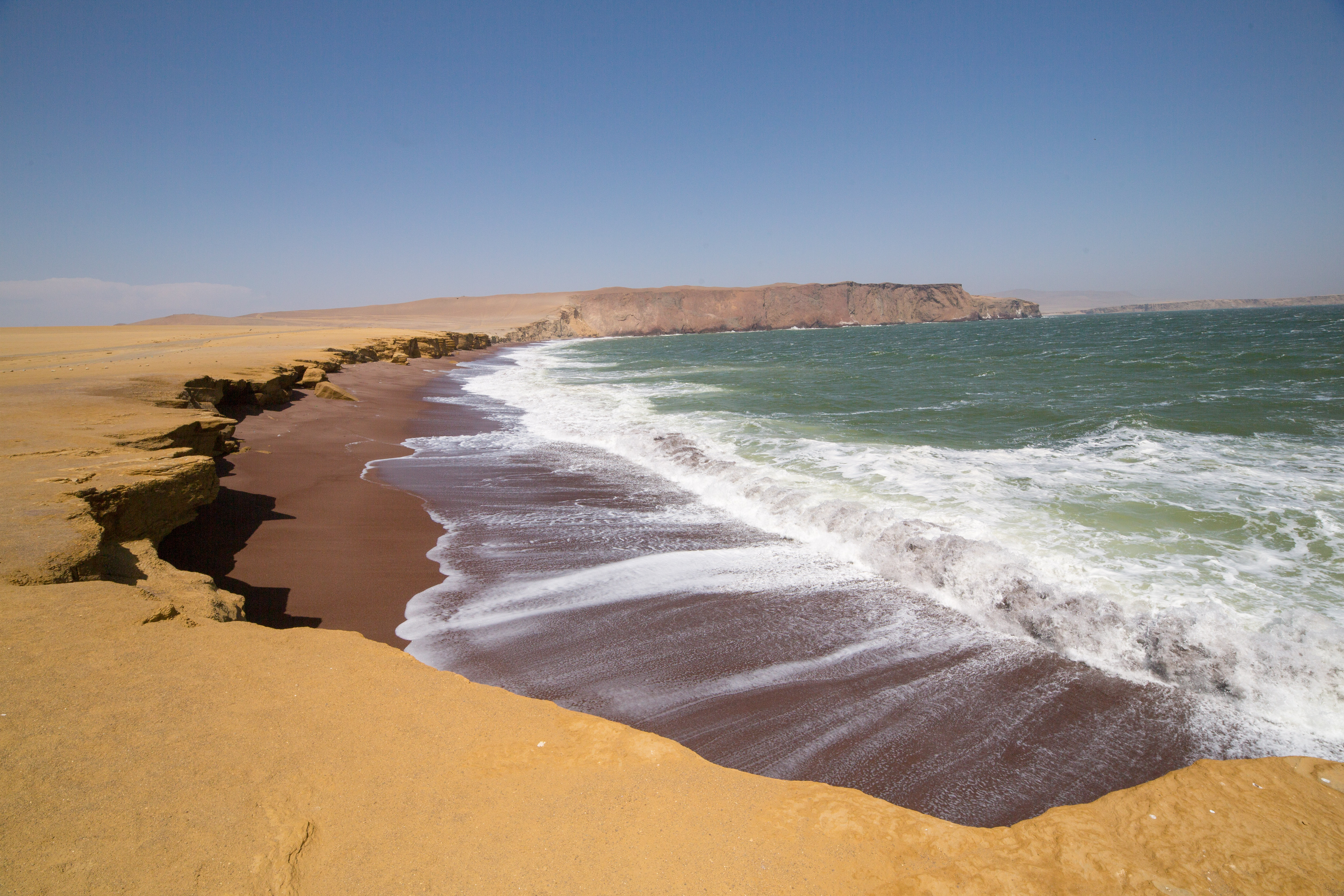
The red beach in Paracas National Reserve

== See also ==
- Humboldt current

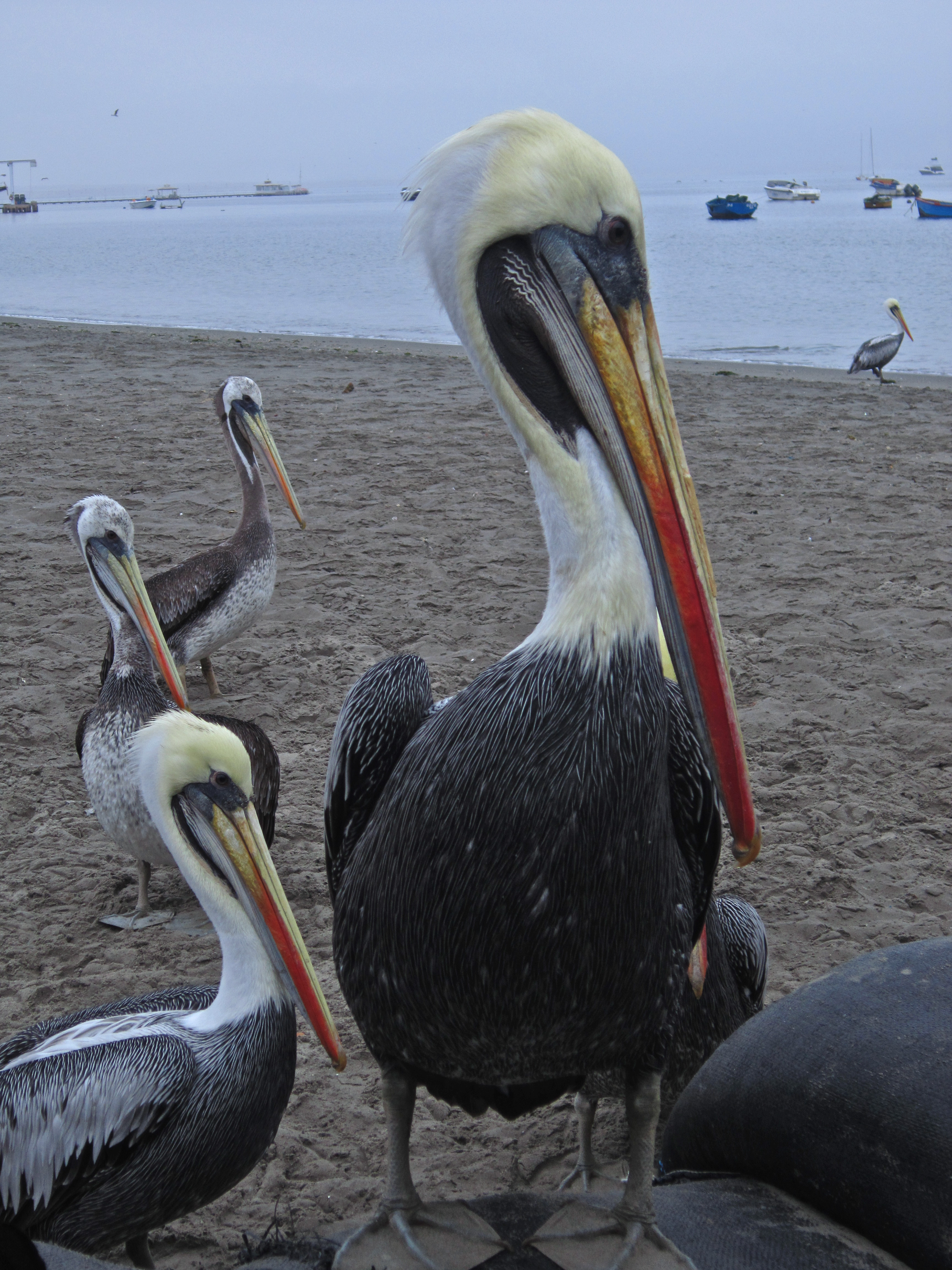
Peruvian pelicans in Paracas National Reserve
