= Paracas Peninsula =

Desert peninsula on Peruvian coast

Coordinates: 13°51′32″S 76°19′44″W

Location of the Paracas Peninsula in the Ica Region of Peru

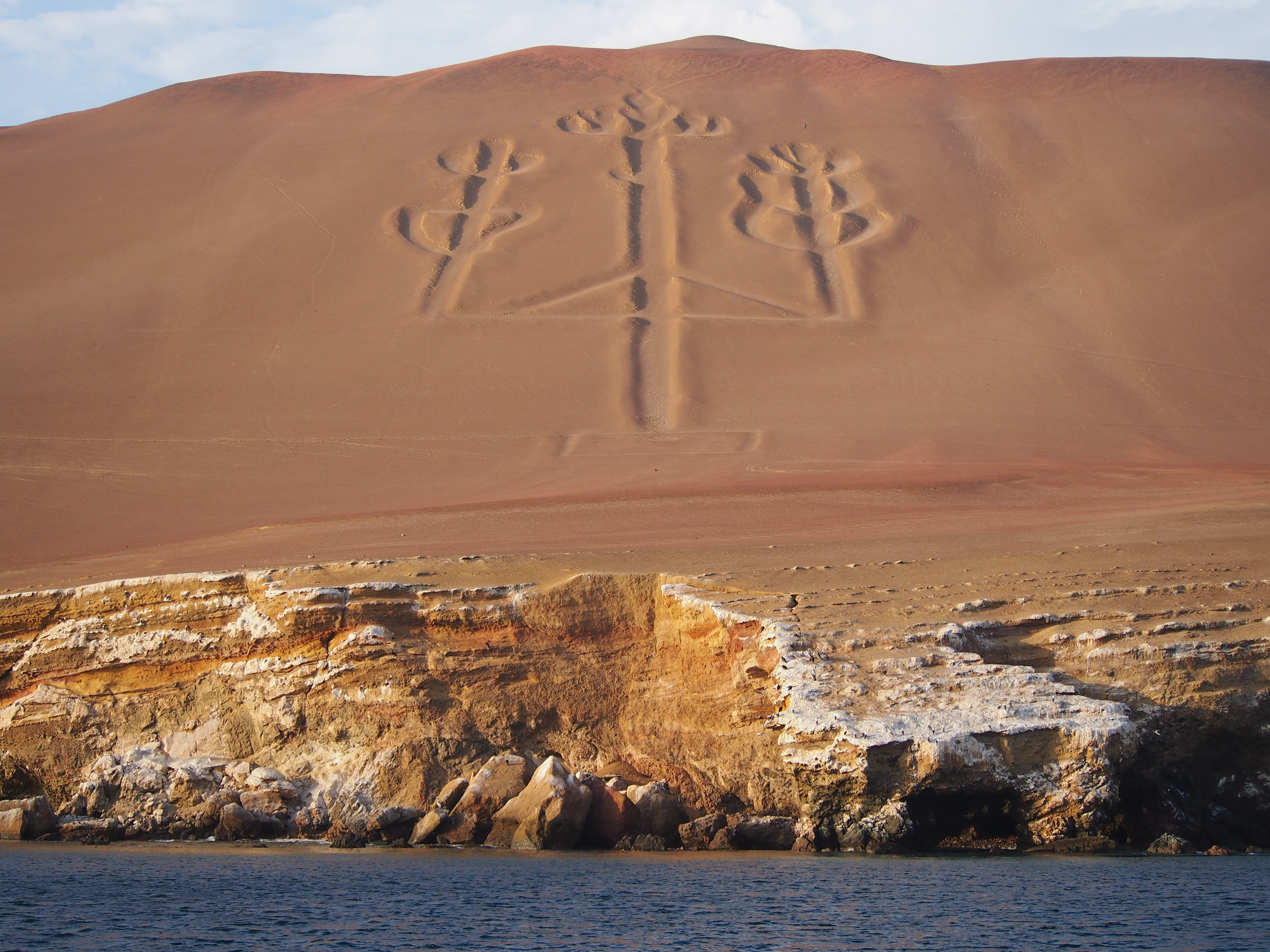
Paracas Candelabra

The Paracas Peninsula is a desert peninsula within the boundaries of the Paracas National Reserve, a marine reserve which extends south along the coast of Peru. It is the only marine reserve in the country. The peninsula is located within the Paracas District of Pisco Province in the Ica Region, on the south coast of Peru. This unusual peninsula may be best known for the Paracas Candelabra, a prehistoric geoglyph nearly 600 ft (183 m) tall that was created on the north face of the peninsula ridge. Pottery nearby was dated to 200 BCE, placing it within the Paracas culture. Its origins and purpose have inspired many theories.

A shipping port was built along the northern peninsula, where deeper water permits larger transport and cruise ships to anchor. Tourists can have access to the Paracas National Reserve, a large marine reserve, while the ships are protected against ocean waves and currents. The peninsula includes red sand beaches formed from sands eroded from nearby cliffs.

The port is reached by a single road from the mainland, and passes through the Paracas National Reserve. The Centre Museum, also called the Paracas Museum, holds several ancient artifacts from the Paracas culture. It also provides detailed information and interpretation about the flora and fauna native to the Reservation, including the many varieties of birds of Paracas.

In 2023, writer Katharine Sohn of Conde Nast Traveller ranked Paracas as one of the 60 most beautiful places in the world.
