= Pisco province =

Coordinates: 13°42′S 76°12′W

Pisco
- Province
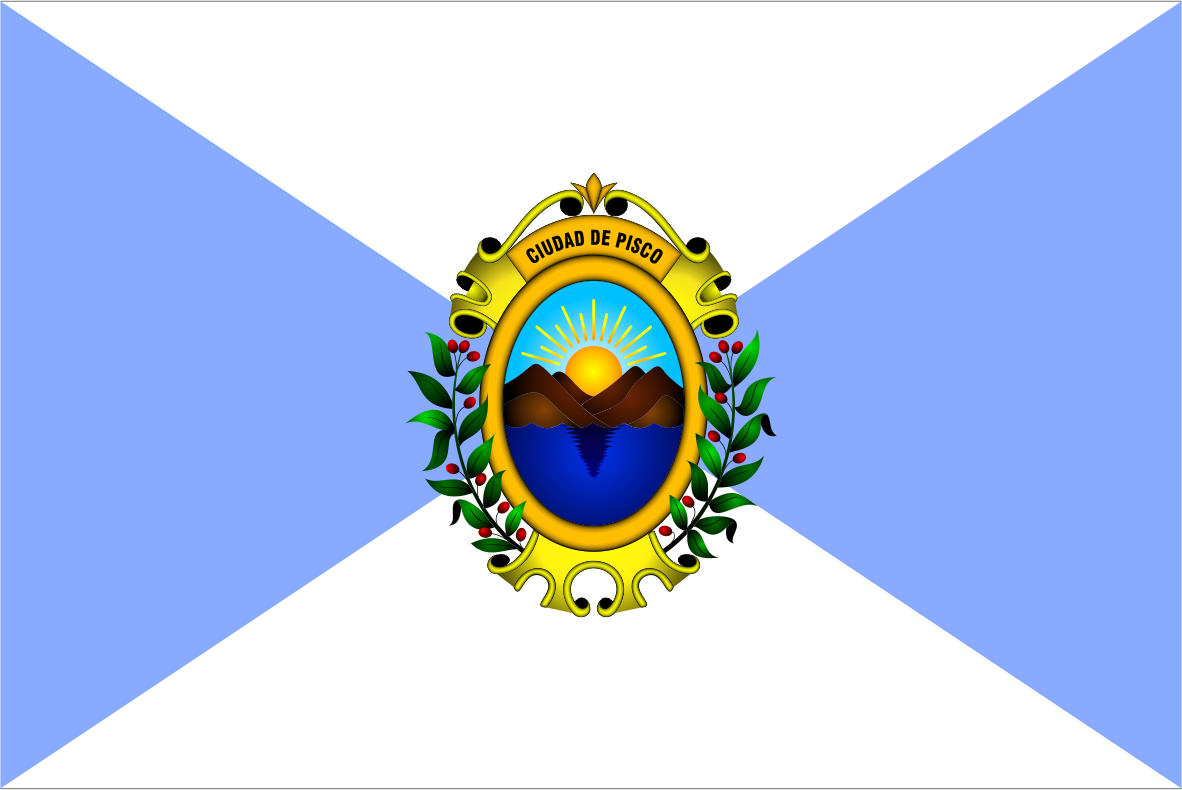
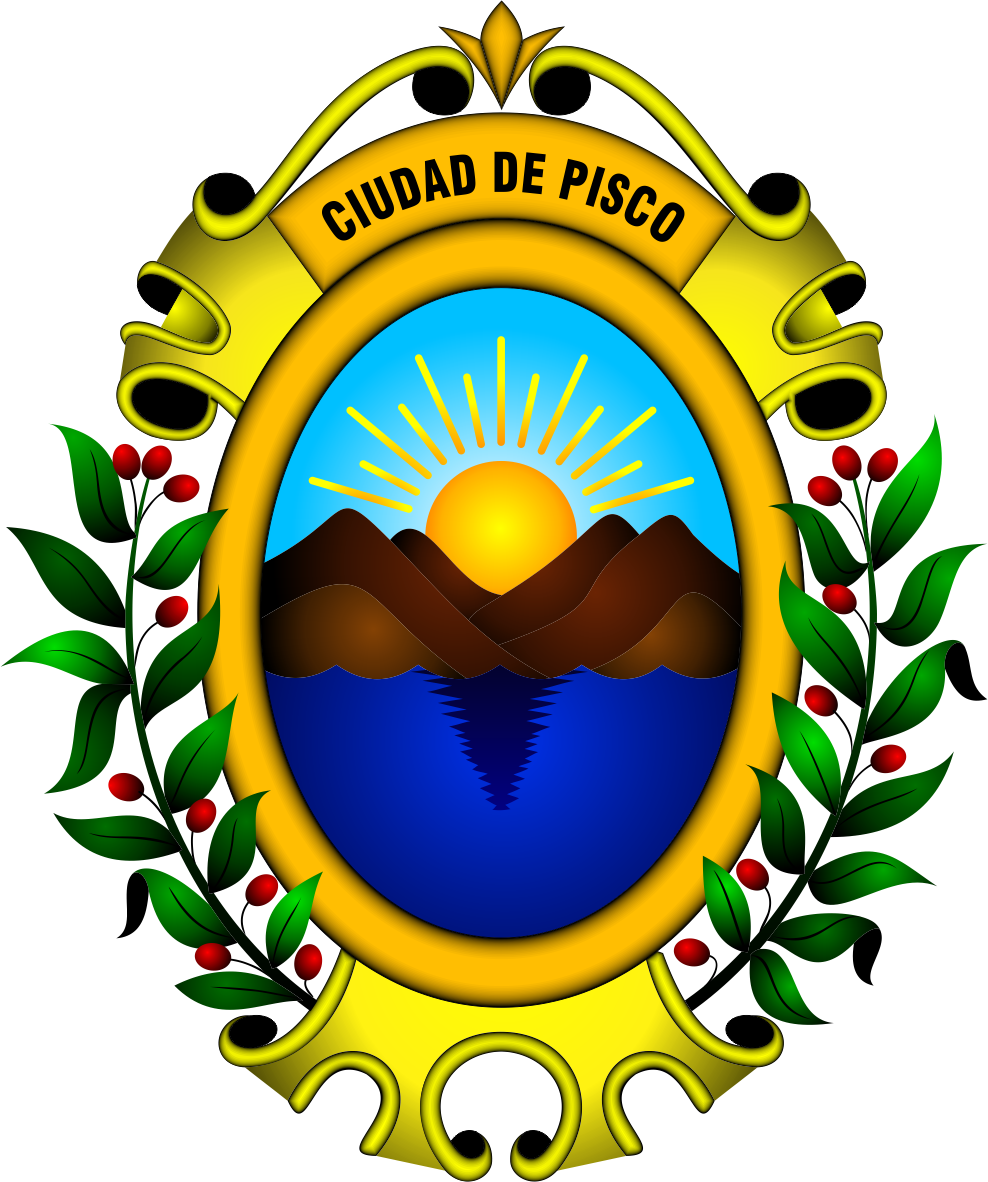
- Flag Coat of arms

- Location of Pisco in the Ica Region
- Country: Peru
- Region: Ica
- Founded: October 13, 1900
- Capital: Pisco

Government
  - Mayor: Juan Enrique Mendoza Uribe

Area
  - Total: 3,978.19 km^{2} (1,535.99 sq mi)

Population
  - Total: 150,744
  - Density: 37.8926/km^{2} (98.1414/sq mi)
- UBIGEO: 1105
- Website: www.munipisco.gob.pe

Pisco is a province of the Ica Region in Peru. Its capital is the town of Pisco, where the popular liquor of the same name originated.

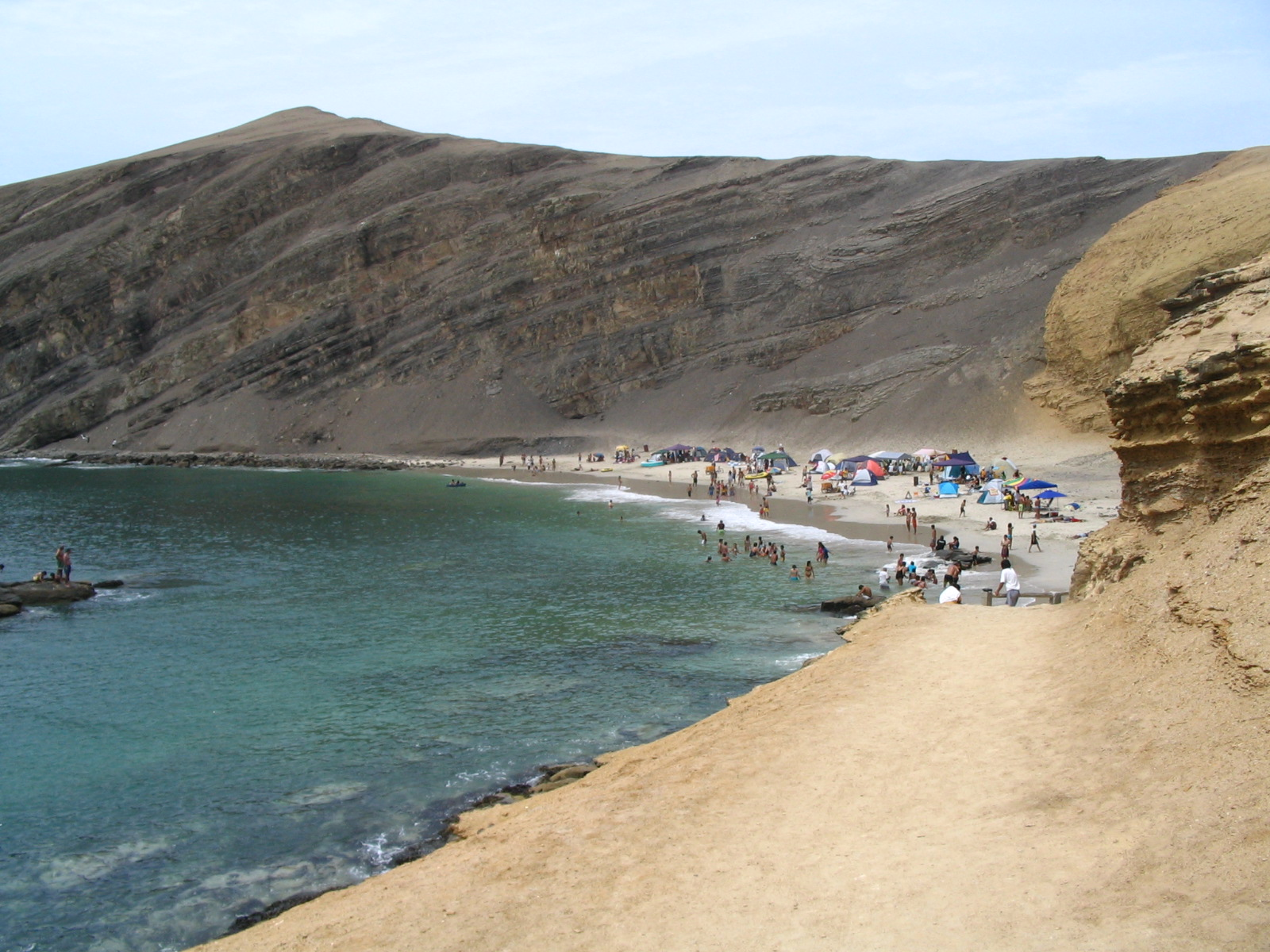
La Mina beach in the Paracas District

== Geography ==
=== Boundaries ===
- North: Chincha Province, Castrovirreyna Province (Huancavelica Region)
- East: Huaytará Province (Huancavelica Region)
- South: Ica Province
- West: Pacific Ocean

== Tourist attractions ==
One of the main attractions of the province is the Paracas National Reservation, where 216 species of birds have been found. Many beaches attract tourists during the summer months.

The coastal desert area around this reserve is the home of the pre-Inca Paracas culture. This people was known for its elaborate textiles and grave goods, including polychrome shawls made with camelid (llama or alpaca) wool and cotton, which date to 600 BCE.

== Political division ==
The province is divided into eight districts (Spanish: distritos, singular: distrito), each of which is headed by a mayor (alcalde):

- Huancano
- Humay
- Independencia
- Paracas
- Pisco
- San Andrés
- San Clemente
- Túpac Amaru Inca

== 2007 earthquake ==
With a moment magnitude of 8.0, more than 400 people died and more than 1,500 were injured during the 2007 Peru earthquake. At least 80% of Pisco was damaged.
