= Department of Ica =

Department of Peru

Coordinates: 14.07°S 75.73°W

Ica Ika (Quechua)
- Department
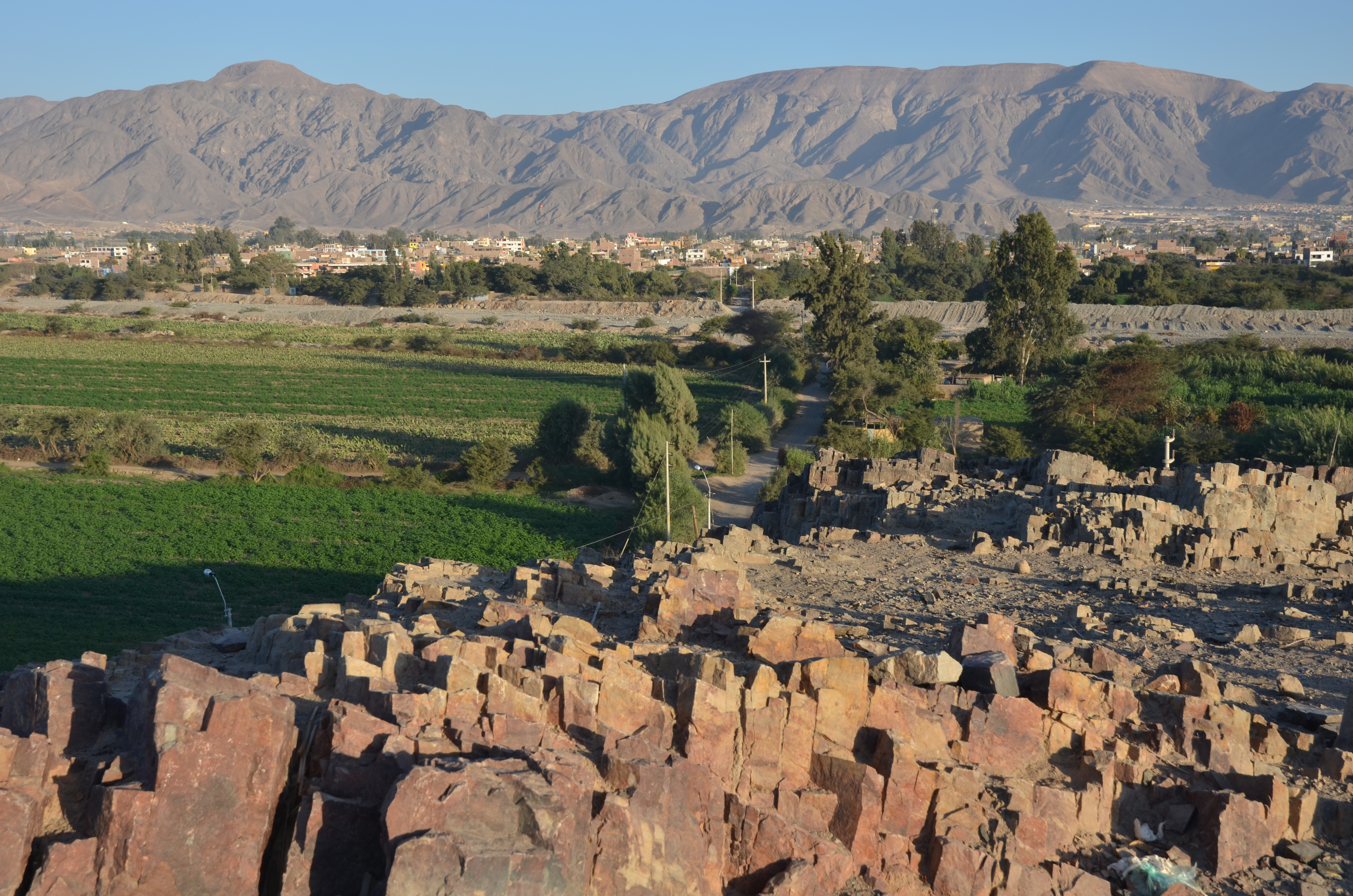

- Flag Coat of arms

- Location of Ica within Peru
- Country: Peru
- Capital: Ica
- Provinces: List: Chincha; Ica; Nazca; Palpa; Pisco

Government
  - Type: Regional Government
  - Governor: Javier Gallegos Barrientos
  - Senator: Rafael Yamashiro (FP)

Area
  - Total: 21,327.83 km^{2} (8,234.72 sq mi)
- Elevation (Capital): 406 m (1,332 ft)
- Highest elevation: 3,796 m (12,454 ft)
- Lowest elevation: 0 m (0 ft)

Population (2025)
  - Total: 1,033,185
  - Density: 48.44304/km^{2} (125.4669/sq mi)
- Demonym: iqueño/a
- Dialing code: 056
- ISO 3166 code: PE-ICA
- Principal resources: Iron, cotton, grapevine, kidney beans.
- Website: www.regionica.gob.pe

Ica (Spanish pronunciation: [ˈika]; Quechua: Ika) is a department of Peru. It borders the Pacific Ocean on the west; Lima to the north; Huancavelica and Ayacucho to the east; and Arequipa to the south. It is administered by a regional government. Its capital is the city of Ica.

== Geography ==
The Department of Ica has a remarkable geography. It is the only region of the southern coast formed by plains, also called coast plains, since the Andean Cordillera rise up inland. Some geological folds have determined the formation of dunes moving toward the sea, which form much of the Paracas Peninsula. Some isolated formations located at the southern part created the Marcona complex, with the biggest deposits of iron in the Pacific coast.

Ica's configuration is due to the geomorphology of its two big and unique fluvial watersheds: the Pasco and Ica rivers. Also, it has a waterway called the Rio Grande, although its waters do not reach the ocean. Some waters are diverted for irrigation and agriculture in the provinces of Palpa, Nazca and Ingenio; the Rio Grande's final riverbed is dry since sand and dried lands absorb its limited resources. There are extensive deserts in Ica, such as the Lancha Pampas. Pozo Santo and Villacuri pampas are extremely hot areas. Strong and persistent winds called paracas are present and stir up large sandstorms.

== History ==
Ica has a rich history. The first settlers are from 10,000 years ago, from which the Wari, Chincha, Nazca, Ica and Paracas cultures developed, the latter being the most important.

The Paracas culture developed from the seventh through the 2nd century BC. It is distinguished by its matchless textile skills, trephinations, and the art of mummifying their dead.

The Nazca culture, on the contrary, well known for its artistic pottery, in which colorful designs and representations excel over the form, the same as their lines and figures that have undergone implausible interpretations. This culture expanded from the 2nd century BC through the 7th century AD. They have left us their wonderful aqueducts that made good use of underground water, of rivers and rain, showing a great knowledge of hydraulic engineering.

In the 15th century, during the Inca Empire, Pachacuti incorporated the territories of Ica, Nazca and the Chincha valley.

Years later, in 1563, with the arrival of the Spanish, Jerónimo Luis de Cabrera founded the Villa de Valverde del Valle de Ica. Since then, the area became an important vineyard and cotton center.

During the independence war, General José de San Martín landed in Paracas and fixed his headquarters in Pisco, to start the fight for the independence of Peru.

== Political division ==
Map of provinces

The region is divided into five provinces (Spanish: provincias, singular: provincia), which are composed of 43 districts (distritos, singular: distrito).

=== Provinces ===
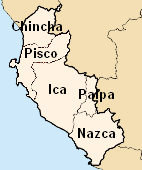
Map of the Ica region showing its provinces

The provinces, with their capitals in parentheses, are:

- Chincha (Chincha Alta)
- Ica (Ica)
- Nazca (Nazca)
- Palpa (Palpa)
- Pisco (Pisco)

== Points of interest ==
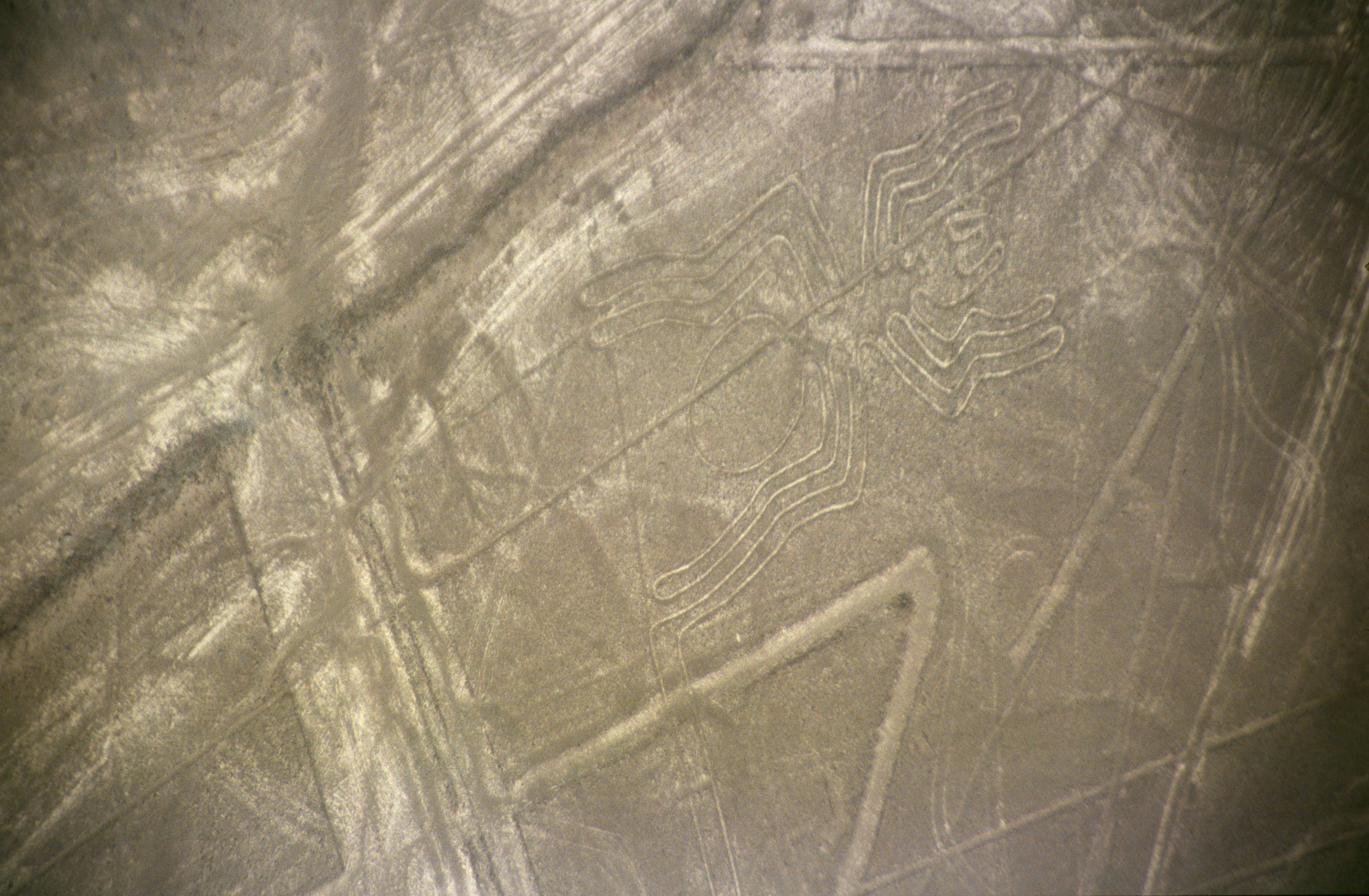
Nazca Lines: figure of the Spider.

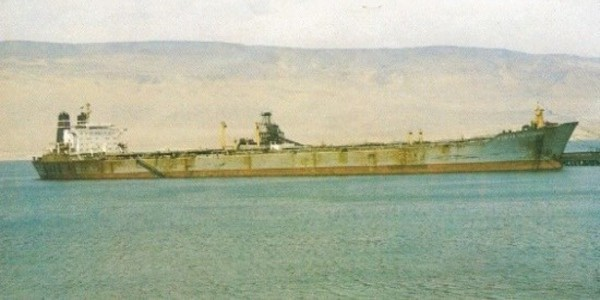
Bay and harbor of San Nicolás in Marcona.

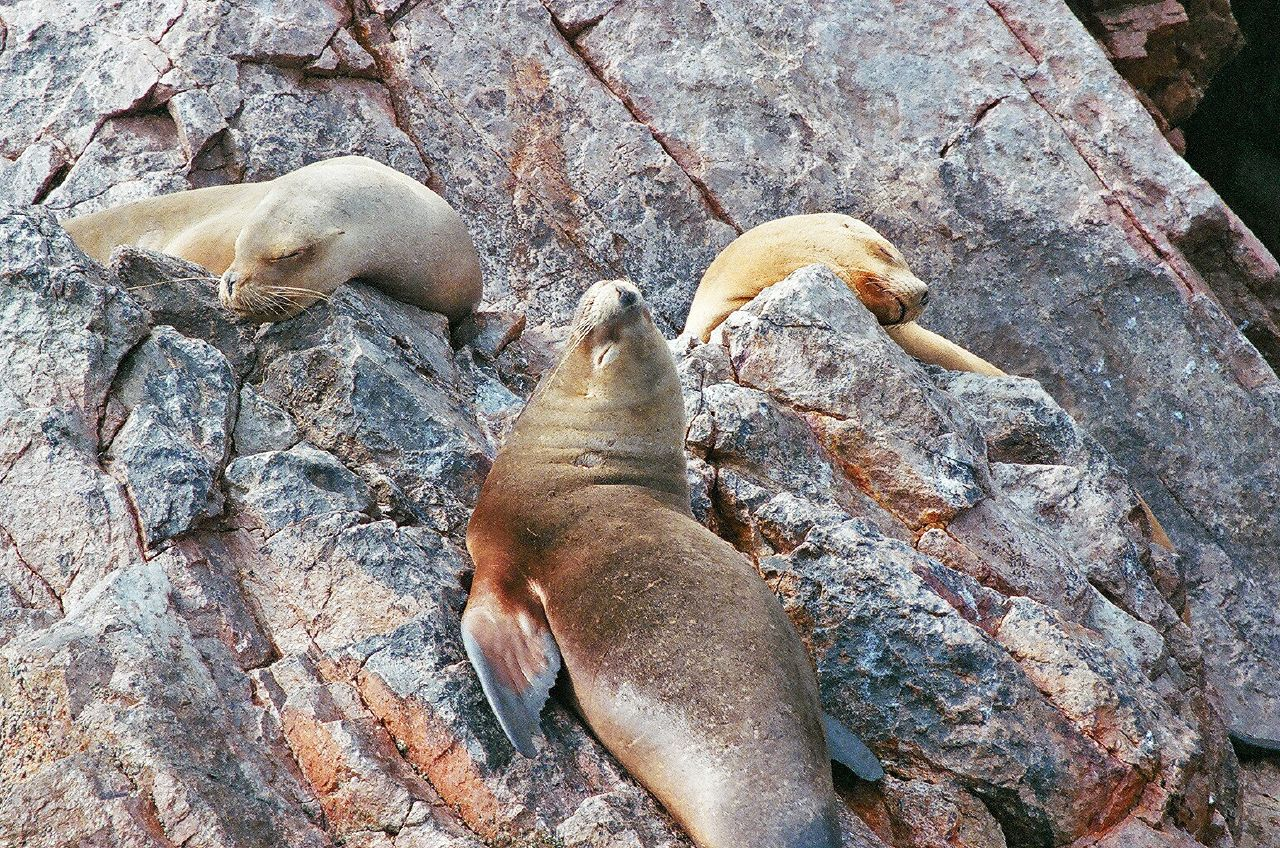
Sea Lions on the Ballestas Islands.

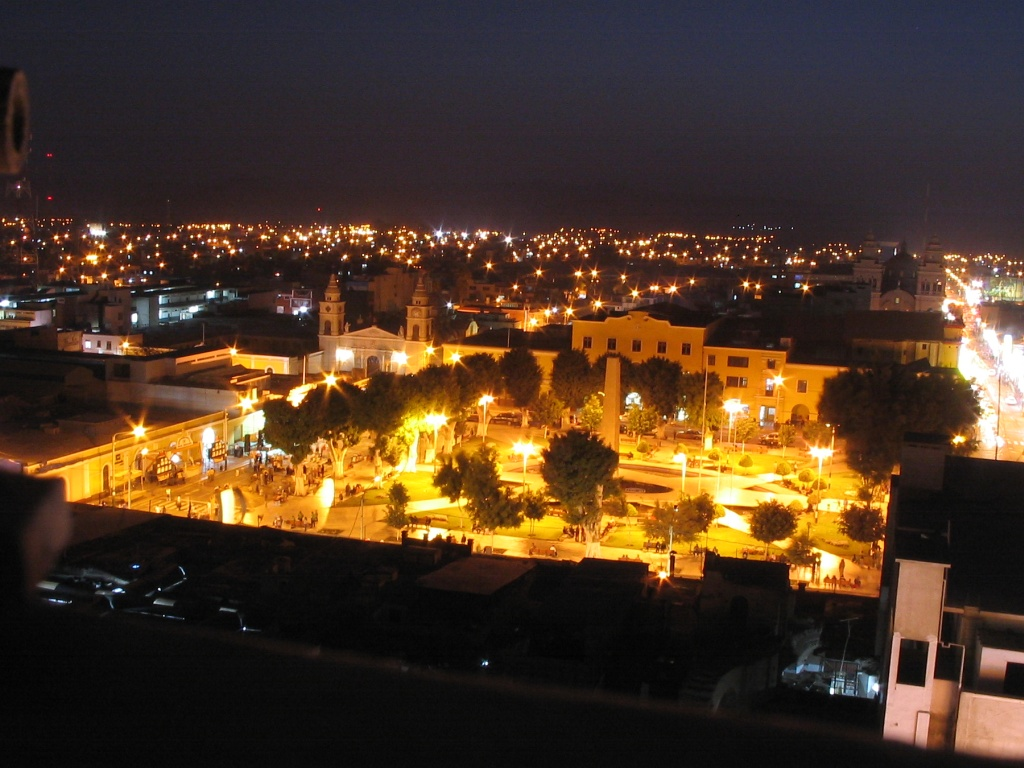
Plaza de Armas in Ica, the oldest part of the capital of the department.

=== City of Ica ===
Capital of the Ica Department. A very modern clean city that has Peruvian street markets, old churches and landmarks, modern malls, hotels, coffee shops, theatres, and hotels.

=== Huacachina ===
Located on the west side of the city of Ica, capital of the Ica Department. One of the most popular places to visit in Ica is La Huacachina. The desert oasis is located 5 km (3.1 mi) from Ica. It is a small lake with medicinal water, lying in the middle of a spectacular sand desert.

=== Pisco ===
Pisco is the most important port in Ica and a litoral province. The most important attractions within this province are likely Paracas, Paracas Bay and the Paracas National Reserve. Pisco was home of an ancient pre-Hispanic culture, Paracas, who are known for their exquisite textiles.

=== Paracas ===
Paracas (a municipality within the Paracas District) is a small town catering to tourism. It serves as the jumping point for tours to Islas Ballestas and to Paracas National Reservation. Paracas Bay, protected by Paracas Peninsula, gives these shallow, warmer waters break from ocean waves permitting life to flourish, particularly near its south western edge encompassed within Paracas National Reserve. The Paracas Museum, also found just near the south western edge of Paracas Bay, provides excellent information about Paracas culture and the many unique species, in particular, the birds of Paracas.

=== Nazca ===
The Ica-Nazca culture flourished along the southern coast of Peru from around 200 BC to 600 AD. This area is extremely dry. The Nazca developed extensive irrigation systems, including underground canals, that allowed them to farm the land. The Nazca are known for their textiles and pottery which feature images of animals and mythological beings.

They are even better known, however, for a unique set of creations known as the Nazca Lines, which are geoglyphs and geometric line clearings in the Atacama desert, in the district of Nazca. On a large, rock-strewn plain, the Nazca made huge drawings by scraping away stones to reveal the lighter soil underneath. The drawings depict various plants and animals, including humans, a monkey, birds, and other creatures, as well as lines and geometric shapes. These drawings are so huge, however, that they can be seen only from the sky. Scientists believe that the Nazca made these drawings for their gods. The area of the Nazca lines is called the Pampa Colorada (red plain).

=== Cachiche ===
A small village near Ica, Cachiche is well known for its history of witches. Doña Julia, Cachiche's first witch, was known to practice "good magic," curing and helping villagers with her spells. Near the entrance to the town, a carving from a single huarango tree depicts this first "bruja de Cachiche" (witch of Cachiche).

== Tourism ==
Ica has significant wine and pisco industries, annual fiestas, a museum and historic colonial churches. The climate is generally sunny and dry due to its elevation above coastal fog and mist. As of 2020, the Peruvian desert, around the Huacachina Oasis, has gotten significantly popular among tourists for sandboarding and sand buggy tours.

There is also a Regional Museum, which exhibits prehistoric artefacts as well as paintings and furniture that date back to the Spanish Colonial era. Moreover, in the museum, mummies with typical Paracas culture skulls can be found.

== See also ==
- 2007 Peru earthquake
- Lost City of Huayuri, Pre-Columbian archaeological site
- Pernil Alto, Pre-Columbian archaeological site
