= Don Martin Island =

Island of Peru

Coordinates: 11°01′12″S 77°40′18″W

The Don Martin Island

Don Martin Island, also known as Don Martin Islet or San Martín Island, is an island belonging to Peru located in the Pacific Ocean, off the coast of the department of Lima. It is located one kilometer southwest of Vegueta Point and has an area of approximately 16.50 hectares. The island is very important because it is a guano deposit and the habitat of numerous species of marine birds, which have found a feeding, breeding and resting area on Don Martín Island. For this reason, in 2009 the island was protected by law within the National Reserve System of Islands, Islets and Puntas Guaneras, a natural reserve that protects and preserves representative samples of the biological diversity of the marine-coastal ecosystems of Peru.

== Geographic description ==
Don Martín Island is under the influence of the cold waters of the Humboldt Current and is located around 11º 01' S latitude and 77° 40' W longitude. The highest point of the island is 50 meters above sea level. It is approximately 800 m long, in a north–south direction, and 200 m wide from east to west. The whitish color of the island is the result of the mixture of the guano layers and the erosion of the rocky surface.

Don Martín Island, with its trapezoidal shape and almost flat relief, has small rocky formations on the southwest side and on the east side there is an area known as La Península, which is a space where, in addition to a dock, there are also areas that house a contingent of workers who come to the island during the guano extraction season.

== Biological diversity ==
Don Martín Island is an important biogeographical point in terms of breeding sites for some species of marine birds such as the Peruvian booby (Sula variegata) and the Humboldt penguin (Spheniscus humboldti). Other species of birds that can be observed include the guanay (Phalacrocorax bougainvillii), the chuita (Phalacrocorax gaimardi), the cushuri (Phalacrocorax brasilianus), the Peruvian pelican (Pelecanus thagus), and the black-billed curlew (Larosterna inca), Peruvian gull (Larus belcheri), Dominican gull (Larus dominicanus), grey gull (Larus modestus), grey capuchin gull (Larus cirrocephalus), Franklin's gull (Larus pipixcan), red-crowned gallinule (Cathartes aura), and grebes (Podiceps major).

The underwater world of Don Martin Island shows an impressive landscape and a lot of life, where fish and invertebrates are the most representative taxonomic groups. The most abundant species of fish are represented by the pejesapo (Gobiesox marmoratus), machete (Ethmidium maculatum), lorna (Sciaena deliciosa), etc. Invertebrates among mollusks and crustaceans are the turban snail (Tegula atra), fan shell (Argopecten purpuratus), clam (Semele corrugata), plover (Semymitilus algosus), hairy crab (Cancer setosus), moon snail (Natica caneloensis), limpet (Fissurella crassa), small crab (Pilumnoides perlatus), wattleshell (Chiton cumingsii), etc.

In the marine mammal group, 2 species have been recorded: the sea otter (Lontra felina) and the South American sea lion (Otaria flavescens), a species of sea lion that belongs to the Otariidae family.

== See also ==
- Guano Islands, Islets, and Capes National Reserve System
