= Guañape Islands =

Islands in Peru

Islas Guañape (Spanish)
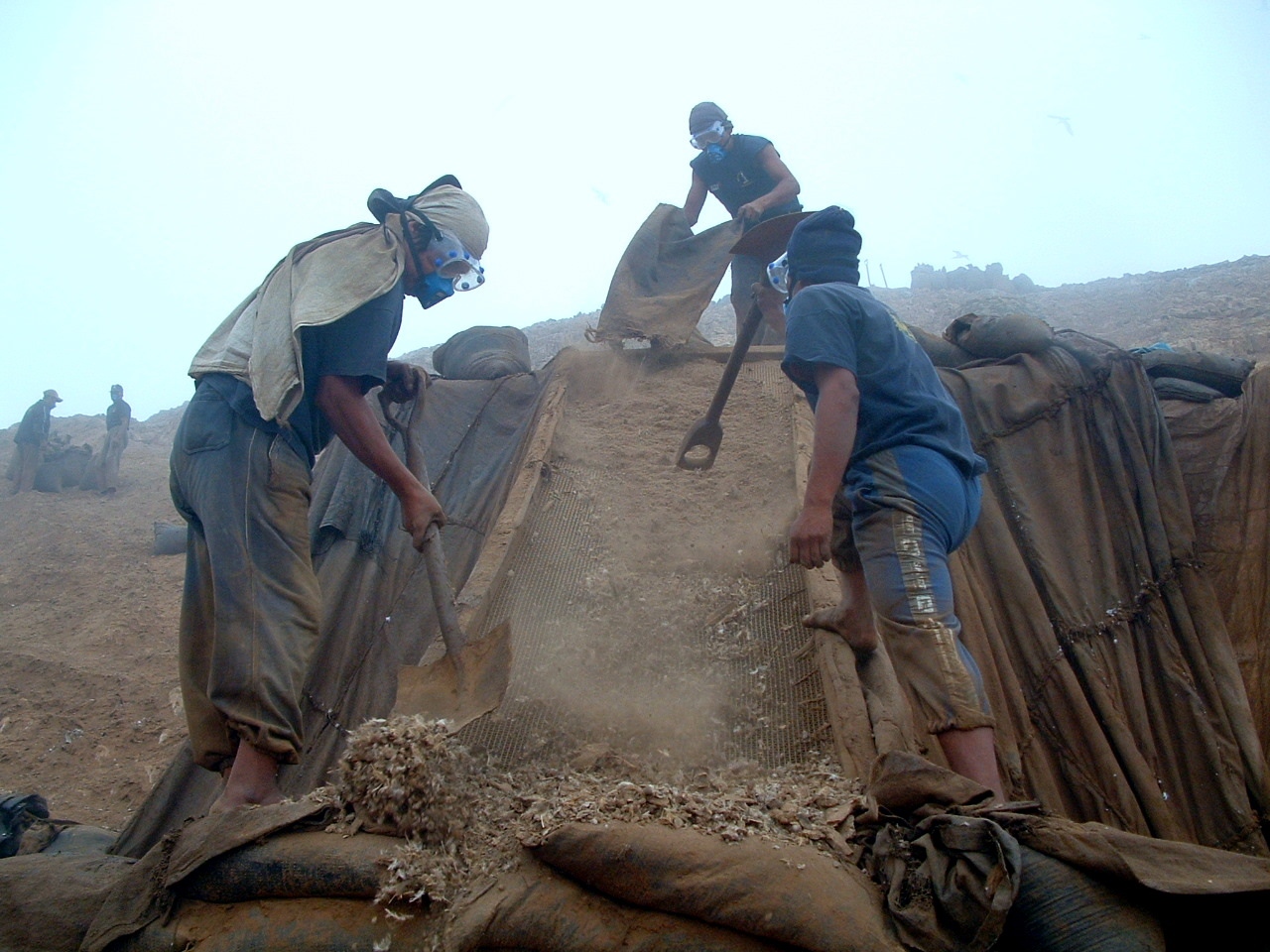
- Workers collecting guano at Guañape Norte Island.

- Location within Peru

Geography
- Location: Pacific Ocean
- Coordinates: 8°32′41″S 78°57′49″W
- Major islands: Guañape Norte Island; Guañape Sur Island; Cantores Islets; Los Leones Islets
- Area: 0.6273 km^{2} (0.2422 sq mi)
- Highest elevation: 143 m (469 ft)

Administration
- Peru
- Region: La Libertad

Additional information
- Time zone: PET (UTC-5)

The Guañape Islands form an island group off the coast of northern Peru. The group consists of four islands: Isla Guañape Norte, Isla Guañape Sur, Islotes Cantores, and Islotes Los Leones.

Off the southern coast of Peru, lie the Chincha, the Ballesta, the Lobos, the Asia, and the Guañape islands. These islands support breeding grounds for a variety of birds that feed on marine creatures. Over thousands of years, a 100-150 feet thick layer of guano accumulated. The primary producers of guano are white-breasted cormorants, grey pelicans, and white-headed gannets. It is estimated that around a million of these birds can live on one island and produce over 1,000 tonnes of guano annually.

== Background ==
Due to the unique weather conditions prevalent along the Peruvian coast, Peruvian guano is considered to be the best for farming. Due to the flow of the cold Humboldt Current along Peru's coast, the cold water prevents rainfall from occurring. The lack of rain on these islands and the tropical heat allow the accumulated guano to be baked naturally. This helps to prevent nitrates from evaporating and protects their use as fertilizer. Another reason for the guano's value is that it comes from fish-eating birds. Due to relative isolation from natural predators, guano-producing birds such as the white-breast cormorant and gray pelican have increased in number.

== Pre-Columbian Era ==
Long before Columbus, the Incas valued guano as a fertilizer. it was so important to their culture that the Incan government divided the guano-bearing islands between the various provinces and dictated harvesting practices and schedules. Incan law provided that killing or disrupting the nesting birds that produced guano was punishable by death.

== Exploitation ==
In 1804 Europeans visited the islands and then returned to Europe with some guano. They understood its usefulness as a fertilizer. Over the ensuing 45 years, Peruvians turned it into a major export product.

== Economic ==
Guano is a highly sought-after commodity for its value as a rich fertilizer. The Peruvian economy depends on guano exports. In the 20th century, artificial fertilizers replaced guano to a large extent, affecting the Peruvian economy. Another threat is ocean warming and the El effect which has disrupted the area's unique ecosystem . It has reduced the number of fish, affecting the bird population, and causing a reduction in guano accumulation, and the economy of Peru.

== Conservation ==
The Guano Islands belong to Peru and provide excellent natural manure. The Peruvian government has taken steps to conserve the guano reserves and prevent their over-exploitation. To maintain supplies, the government of Peru ensures that the islands and the birds, such as pelicans and cormorants, and the gannets are well fed and cared for.

== See also ==
- Guano Islands, Islets, and Capes National Reserve System
