= Lobos de Tierra =

Island belonging to Peru

Lobos de Tierra Island
Isla Lobos de Tierra (Spanish)
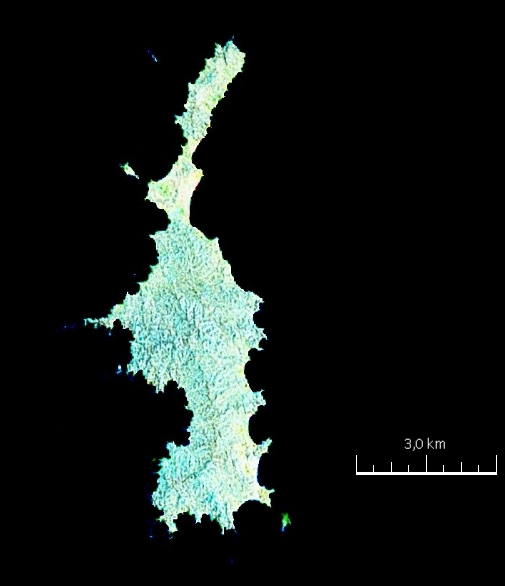
- Satellite view of the island.

- Location within Peru

Geography
- Location: Pacific Ocean
- Coordinates: 6°25′40″S 80°51′29″W
- Area: 16 km^{2} (6.2 sq mi)
- Length: 10 km (6 mi)
- Width: 3 km (1.9 mi)

Administration
- Peru
- Region: Lambayeque

Additional information
- Time zone: PET (UTC-5)

Lobos de Tierra is a Peruvian island situated 19 km from the mainland close to the Illescas Peninsula and the boundary between the departments of Piura and Lambayeque regions. Its area is 16 km^{2}, its approximate length is 10 km, and its approximate width is 3 km. Around the island there are several islets such as El León and Albatros. It is part of Peru’s Guano Islands, Islets, and Capes National Reserve System.

== History ==
In 1863 the island was estimated to have guano deposits of almost 7 million metric tons, which were then exploited without any control. The number proved to be an overestimate and today that wealth has almost disappeared and the little remaining guano does not have the same quality as before.

== Environment ==
The climate of Lobos de Tierra is warm and dry. It owes its name to its proximity to the coast and the presence of eared seals ("lobo marino" in Spanish, or "sea wolves"). At times blue whales can be seen.

The island is home to birds such as the kelp gulls, boobies and cormorants who were the primary producers during the heyday of guano collecting. It has been designated an Important Bird Area (IBA) by BirdLife International because it supports significant populations of resident or breeding seabirds, including Humboldt penguins, Peruvian diving-petrels, Peruvian pelicans, blue-footed and Peruvian boobies, and red-legged and guanay cormorants.

== See also ==
- List of islands of Peru
- Guano Islands, Islets, and Capes National Reserve System
