= Huaura Islands =

Archipelago in Peru

Islas de Huaura (Spanish)
- Location within Peru

Geography
- Location: Pacific Ocean
- Coordinates: 11°24′0″S 77°45′32″W
- Major islands: Mazorca, Huampanú, Pelado

Administration
- Peru
- Region: Lima

Additional information
- Time zone: PET (UTC-5)

The Huaura Islands are an archipelago in Peru, comprising uninhabited islands and islets located in the Pacific Ocean.

Mazorca Island is the largest island of the group, reaching a maximum elevation of 78 m. There is also a lighthouse on the island.

Birds found on the islands include the guanay cormorant, the Peruvian booby and the Humboldt penguin.

== Islands ==
Islas Grupo de Huaura
N.º	Name of island	Area (hectares)	Coordinates
1	es:Isla Mazorca	11,63
2	Isla Brava	4,20
3	es:Isla Huampanú	2,25
4	Isla Pelado	1,95
5	Islote Chuquitanta o Caquitina	0,75
6	Islote Chiquitina	0,18
7	Islote Tambillo	0,13
