= Lobos de Afuera =

Islands of Peru

Native name: Isla Lobos de Afuera
- Interactive map of Lobos de Afuera

Geography
- Location: Pimentel District, Peru
- Coordinates: 06°57′35″S 80°42′00″W
- Total islands: 12
- Major islands: 2
- Area: 2.35 km^{2} (0.91 sq mi)
- Length: 4.8 km (2.98 mi)
- Width: 3.2 km (1.99 mi)
- Highest point: 61 m

Administration
- Peru

Lobos de Afuera is a small, rocky Peruvian archipelago lying in the eastern Pacific Ocean some 54 km off the coast of the Pimentel District of Peru. The archipelago is about 4.8 km long, north-west to south-east, and 3.2 km wide. It comprises two main islands, Independencia and Cachimbo, separated by a channel 36 m wide, along with several reefs, rocks and islets. It is part of Peru's Guano Islands, Islets, and Capes National Reserve System, and has a history of guano extraction.

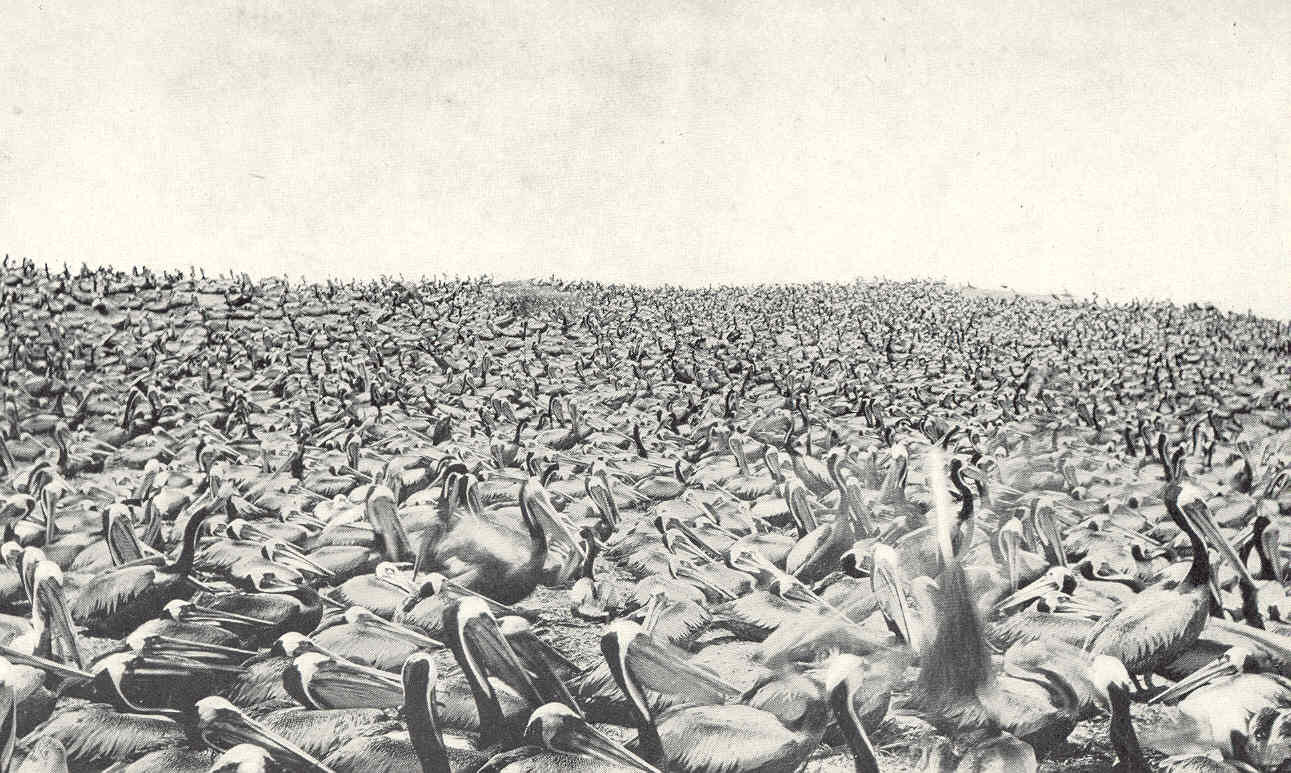
1910 photo of Peruvian pelican colony on Lobos de Afuera

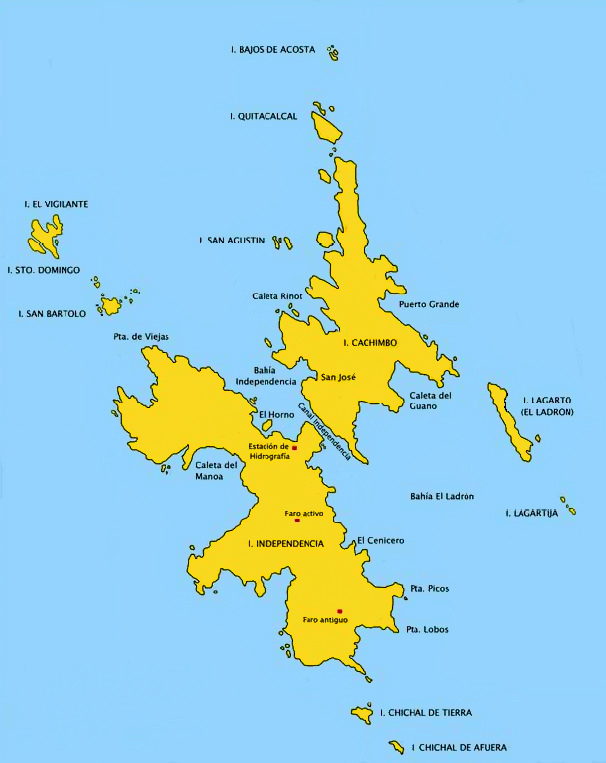
Map of the archipelago

== Environment ==
A 235 ha site encompassing Lobos de Afuera and its surrounding waters has been designated an Important Bird Area (IBA) by BirdLife International because it supports colonies of seabirds, including Humboldt penguins and guanay cormorants.
