= Ballestas Islands =

Pacific Ocean archipelago of Peru

Islas Ballestas (Spanish)
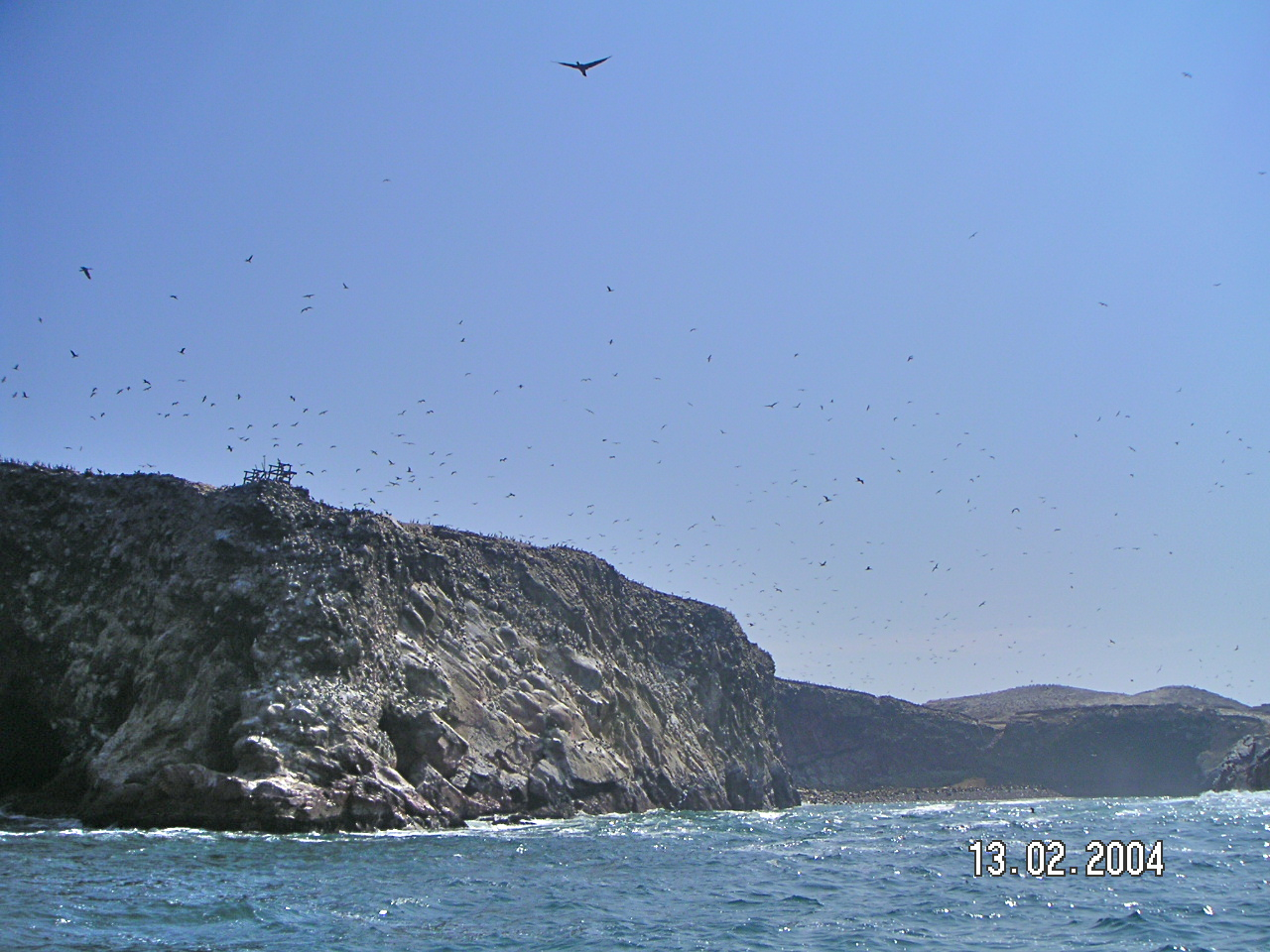
- Partial view of Ballesta Centro Island.

- Location within Peru

Geography
- Location: Pacific Ocean
- Coordinates: 13°44′09″S 76°23′47″W
- Major islands: Ballesta Norte, Ballesta Centro, Ballesta Sur

Administration
- Peru
- Region: Ica

Additional information
- Time zone: PET (UTC-5)

The Ballestas Islands (Spanish: Islas Ballestas) are a group of small islands near the town of Paracas within the Paracas District of the Pisco Province in the Ica Region, on the south coast of Peru.

== Geography ==
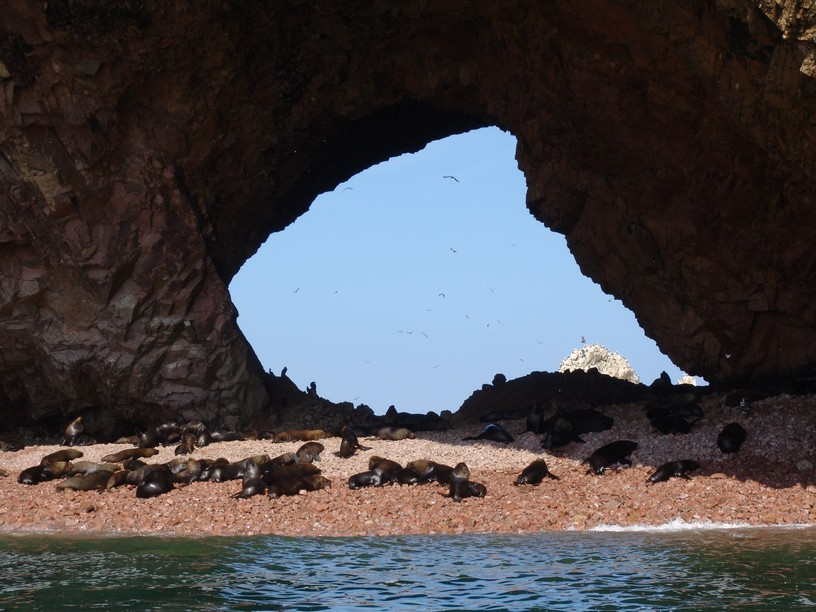
Sea lions at Islas Ballestas.

Composed largely of rock formations and covering an estimated area of 0.12 km^{2}, these islands are an important sanctuary for marine fauna like Humboldt penguin, guanay cormorant, red-legged cormorant, Peruvian booby, blue-footed booby, Peruvian pelican, and Inca tern. Other notable species include two types of seals (fur seals and sea lions), amongst other mammals.

== Access ==
These islands are accessible from the resort town of Paracas (near Pisco) by tour boat which typically lasts 2 hours. During the visits it is not uncommon for the sea lions to approach the tourist boats, providing enjoyment for the visiting tourists.

On the way to the islands, visitors can see El Candelabro, a large-scale geoglyph on the Paracas Peninsula that may have served as a beacon to mariners. The mystery as to the origins of this particular geoglyph is ongoing with much speculation. The visit to the Ballestas Islands is, from an ecotourism point of view, probably the best known along the Peruvian coast.

== See also ==
- Guano Islands, Islets, and Capes National Reserve System
