= Chao-Corcovado-Santa-Ferrol Islands Important Bird Area =

Islands belonging to Peru

Coordinates: 08°57′42″S 78°43′15″W

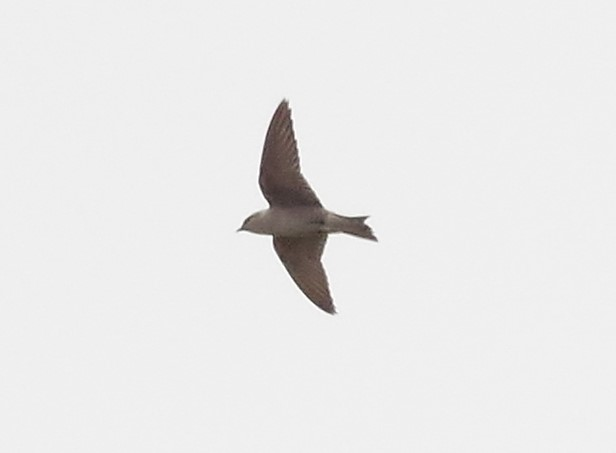
Peruvian martins breed on the islands

The Chao-Corcovado-Santa-Ferrol Islands Important Bird Area is a complex of four small and rocky islands off the Pacific coast of South America. They have a rugged, cliffed relief and are largely unvegetated. Collectively, they have an area of 185 ha and a maximum elevation of about 100 m. They lie between 0.6 and 5.8 km from the coast of Peru near the city of Chimbote. They are part of Peru's Guano Islands, Islets, and Capes National Reserve System, and have a history of guano extraction. The islands were designated an Important Bird Area (IBA) by BirdLife International because they support a significant population of Peruvian martins.
