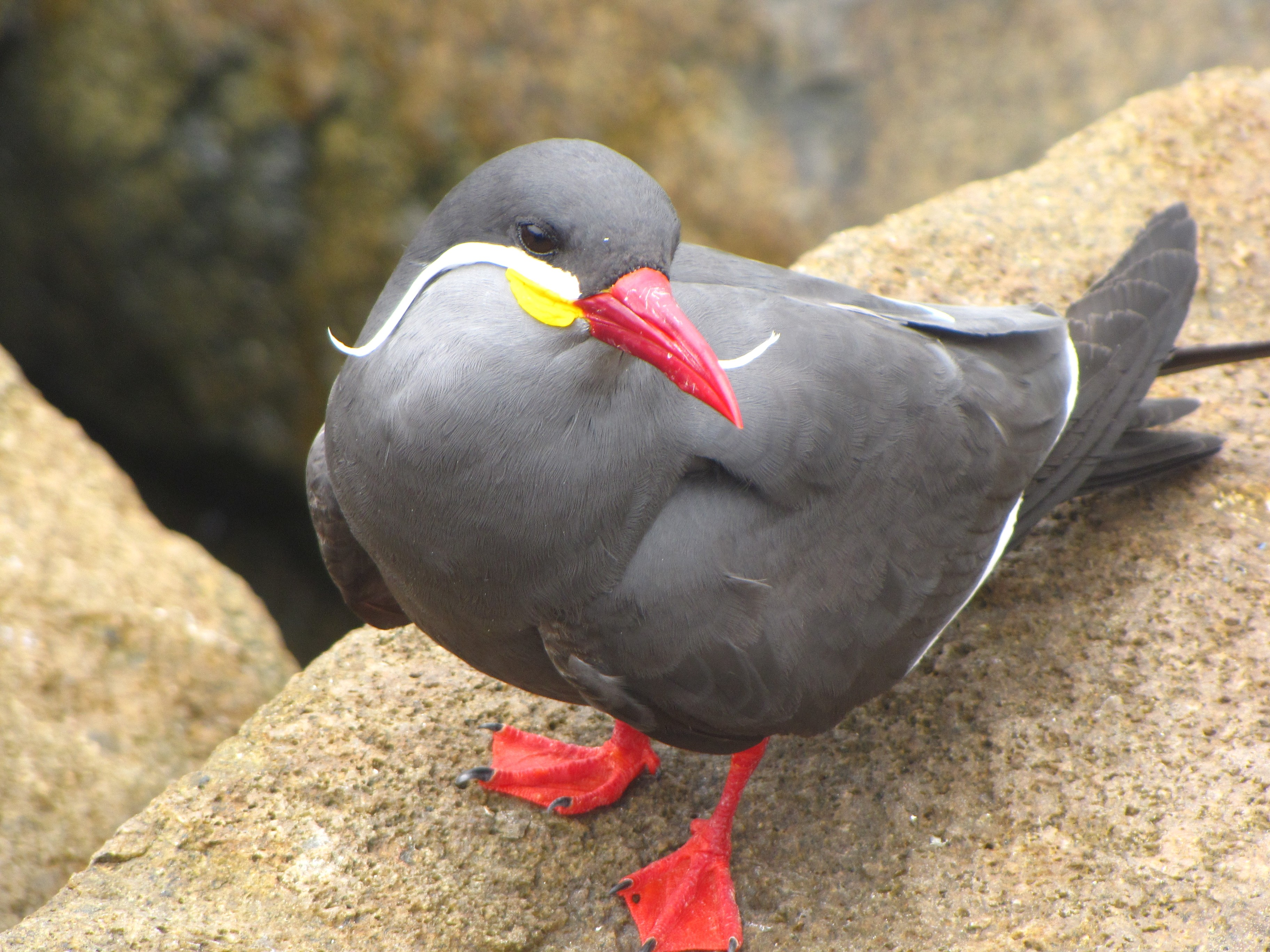
- Inca tern at Lima, Peru

Conservation status
- Near Threatened (IUCN 3.1)

Scientific classification
- Kingdom: Animalia
- Phylum: Chordata
- Class: Aves
- Order: Charadriiformes
- Family: Laridae
- Genus: Larosterna; Blyth, 1852
- Species: L. inca

Binomial name
- Larosterna inca (Lesson & Garnot, 1827)
- Range of L. inca Year-round range Non-breeding range

= Inca tern =

Species of bird

The Inca tern (Larosterna inca) is a near-threatened species of tern in the subfamily Sterninae of the family Laridae (the gulls, terns, and skimmers). It is found along the Pacific coasts of Chile, Ecuador and Perú, and has appeared as a vagrant in Central America and Hawaii.

== Taxonomy and systematics ==
The Inca tern is the sole member of its monotypic genus Larosterna, and has no accepted subspecies. Perhaps surprisingly given its highly distinct plumage, the Inca tern is not particularly basal among the terns, being more closely related to typical Sterna terns than any of the superficially much more similar genera Gelochelidon, Hydroprogne, Onychoprion, Phaetusa, or Sternula are.

== Description ==
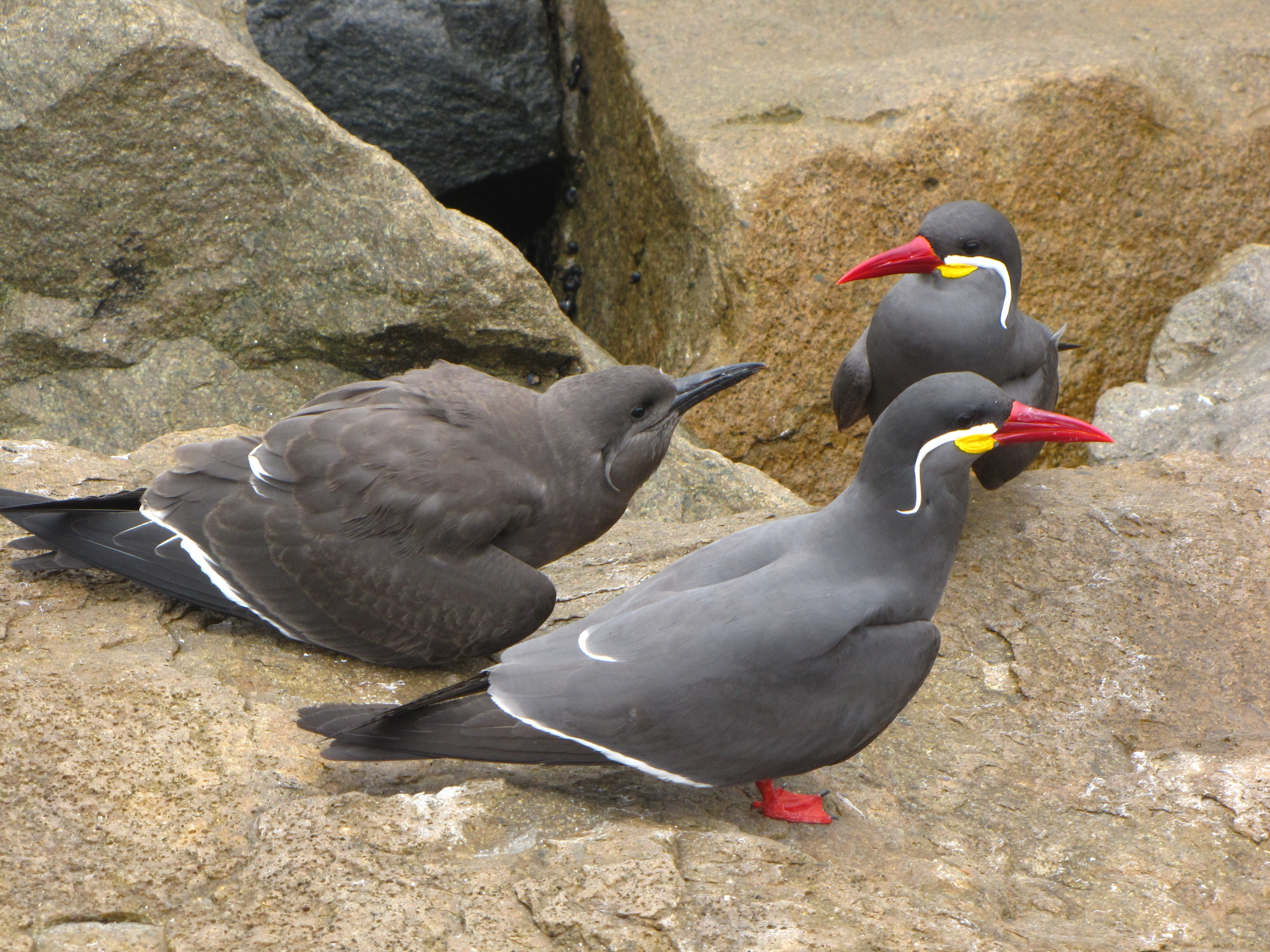
Two adults and a juvenile (left) in Lima, Perú

The Inca tern is roughly 39 to 42 cm (15 to 17 in) long and weighs between 180 to 210 g (6.3 to 7.4 oz). Its plumage is uniquely colored among terns; adults have a mostly dark, slate-gray body, with paler underwing coverts, and a slightly paler throat. A white stripe extends back from the base of the bill and fans out like a Salvador Dalíesque mustache as long, satiny feathers along the side of the neck. The trailing edge of the wing (the tips of the secondaries and the three inner primaries) are white. The tail is black, and moderately forked. The iris is brown, with legs and feet that are dark red. The bill is bright to dark red, with bare yellow skin at the base. The chicks, on hatching, are purplish-brown, progressing through brownish-gray before developing mature plumage. The chicks' bills and legs are dark and horn-colored, and gradually attain the red that adults have.

== Distribution and habitat ==
The Inca tern is an inhabitant of the Humboldt Current region. It breeds from Lobos de Tierra, in northern Perú, south to the Aconcagua River, near Valparaíso, Chile. Some disperse north into Ecuador after breeding, and south to the Puerto Montt area of Chile, where multiple 'research-grade' sightings with photos on the biodiversity database iNaturalist, including a group of four together. It is a casual visitor to Panamá and Costa Rica, and has also been recorded as a vagrant in Guatemala and Hawaii. The documented Hawaiian birds, in particular, remained from March through November on the Hawaiian archipelago.

The South American Classification Committee of the American Ornithological Society treats the Inca tern's presence in Colombia as "hypothetical", due to a number of unverified or undocumented sightings. On iNaturalist, one 'research-grade' sighting (with photo) has been documented from the coast of Buenaventura, Colombia's Isla Cascajal, dated July 2023; however, the species' popularity in captivity (see Captivity below) complicates assessment of extralimital records.

The Inca tern nests on sea cliffs and guano islands, as well as manmade structures (such as ledges under piers) and abandoned barges. It will gather with other sea and shorebirds on sandy beaches.

== Behavior ==
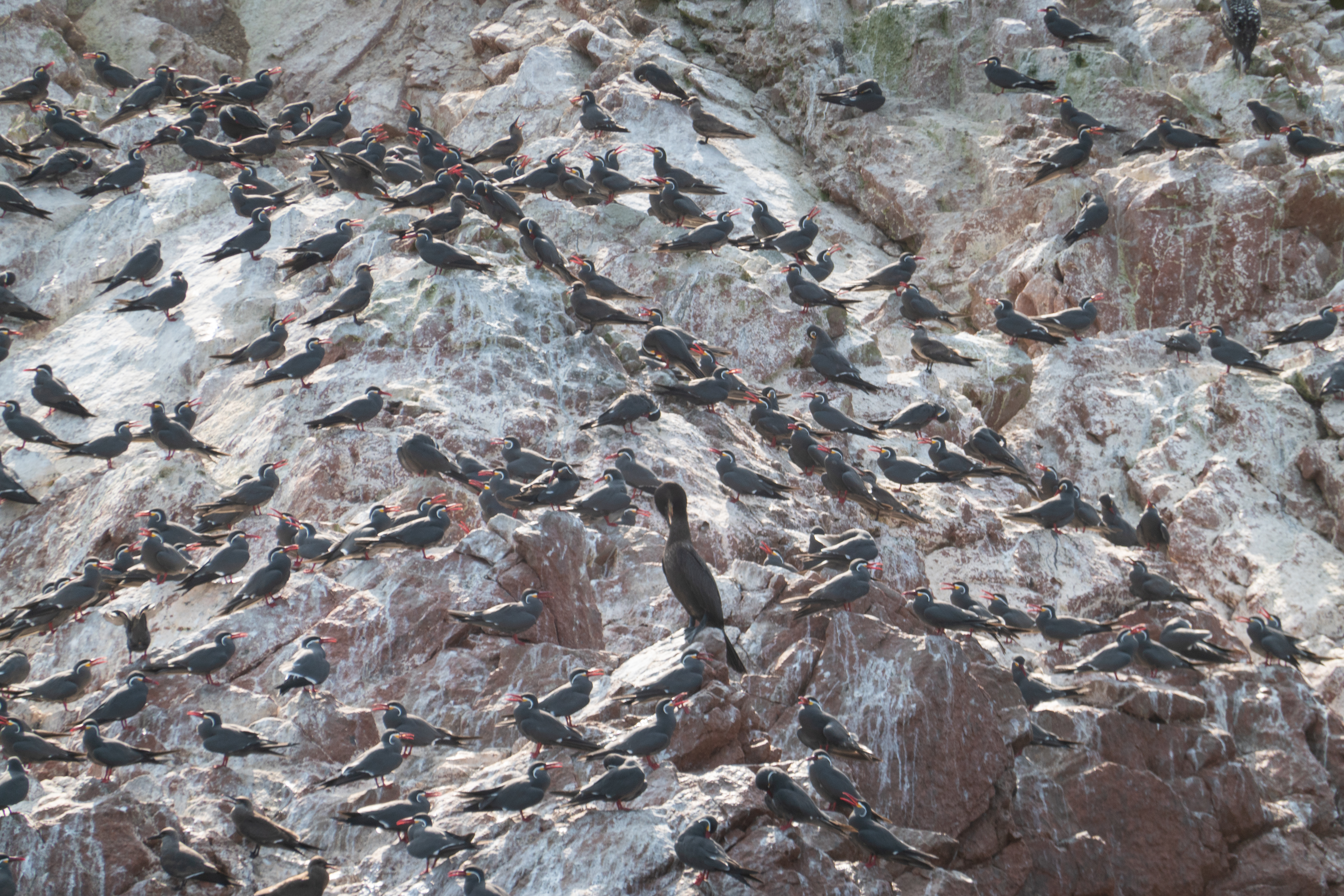
Large flocks may occur where conditions are suitable, as here on the Islas Ballestas off the Peruvian coast.

=== Movement ===
The Inca tern is essentially non-migratory, although some disperse northwards after breeding. Some rogue individuals have flown great distances.

=== Feeding ===
The Inca tern feeds primarily on small fish, such as anchoveta (Engraulis ringens), and also consumes planktonic crustaceans and offal or carrion in its diet. Large flocks congregate around fishing boats and will also follow the feeding patterns of cormorants, sea lions, and whales and dolphins. Feeding flocks can number over 5,000 birds. The Inca tern catches its prey mainly by plunge-diving, but also picks items from the surface while flying or floating on the water.

=== Breeding ===
Breeding does not appear to be concentrated in any season. Eggs have been found between April and July and between October and December, and other evidence of breeding has been noted in August. It nests in a variety of sites including fissures and caves in rock cliffs, among rocks and boulders on island slopes, in abandoned petrel and penguin burrows, and on and under human structures. The clutch size is usually two eggs though sometimes one. Both sexes incubate the clutch and provision the young. The incubation period is not known; fledging occurs about four weeks after hatch and the young are fully dependent on the adults for at least a month after fledging.

=== Vocalization ===
The Inca tern is most vocal at its nesting colonies. Its calls include "raucous cackling notes" and "mewing"; the latter call has been likened to that of a kitten.

== Status ==
The IUCN has assessed the Inca tern as Near Threatened. It has a somewhat restricted range; its population size is not known and is believed to be decreasing. "Reproductive success is dramatically reduced during El Niño events". Human harvesting of its primary prey is a probable threat as is climate change. One estimate placed its population at about 150,000 in 2011.

== Captivity ==
Inca terns in captivity

Because of its unusual plumage, the species is popular in zoos. Escapes from captivity can occur, which leads to problems determining genuine vagrancy.
