= Guano Islands, Islets, and Capes National Reserve System =

Protected area of Peru

- IUCN category VI (protected area with sustainable use of natural resources)
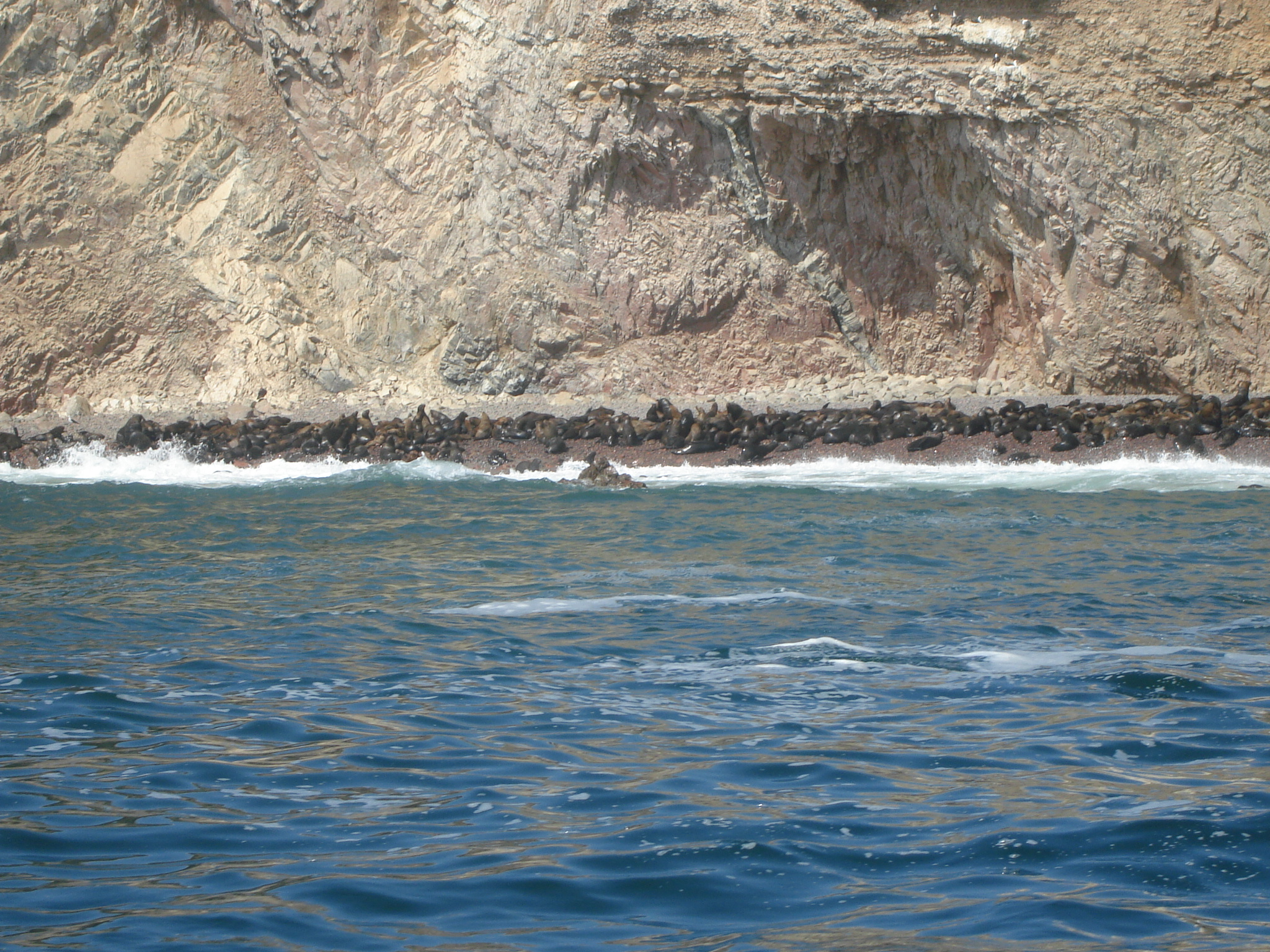
- Sea lions at the Ballestas Islands
- Interactive map of Guano Islands, Islets, and Capes National Reserve System
- Location: Peruvian coast
- Area: 140,833.47 ha (543.7611 sq mi)
- Governing body: SERNANP
- Administrator: SINANPE - SERNANP

The Guano Islands, Islets, and Capes National Reserve System (Spanish: Reserva Nacional Sistema de Islas, Islotes y Puntas Guaneras; RNSIIPG) is a protected area of the Peruvian State that includes 22 islands, islets and groups of islands as well as 11 points along the Peruvian coast from Piura to Tacna. It has a discontinuous area of 140,833.47 hectares.

The idea of its formation is to protect populations of birds and other marine species, and promote the sustainable management of natural resources (guano, fish and marine invertebrates), and scientific research and environmental education.

== Jurisdiction ==
From north to south it includes:

- Lobos de Tierra
- Lobos de Afuera
- Maccabí Islands
- Guañape Islands
- Chao Islands
- Corcovado Island
- Santa Island
- Punta Culebras
- Punta La Litera
- Punta Colorado
- Don Martin Island
- Punta Salinas, Huampanú Island, and Mazorca Island
- Grupo de Pescadores Islands
- Cavinzas Islands
- Palomino Islands
- Pachacámac Islands
- Asia Island
- Chincha Islands
- Ballestas Islands
- Punta Lomitas
- Punta San Juan
- Punta Lomas
- Punta Atico
- Punta La Chira
- Punta Hornillos
- Punta Coles

== See also ==
- List of protected areas of Peru
