= Chincha Islands =

Three small islands off the coast of Peru

Islas Chincha (Spanish)
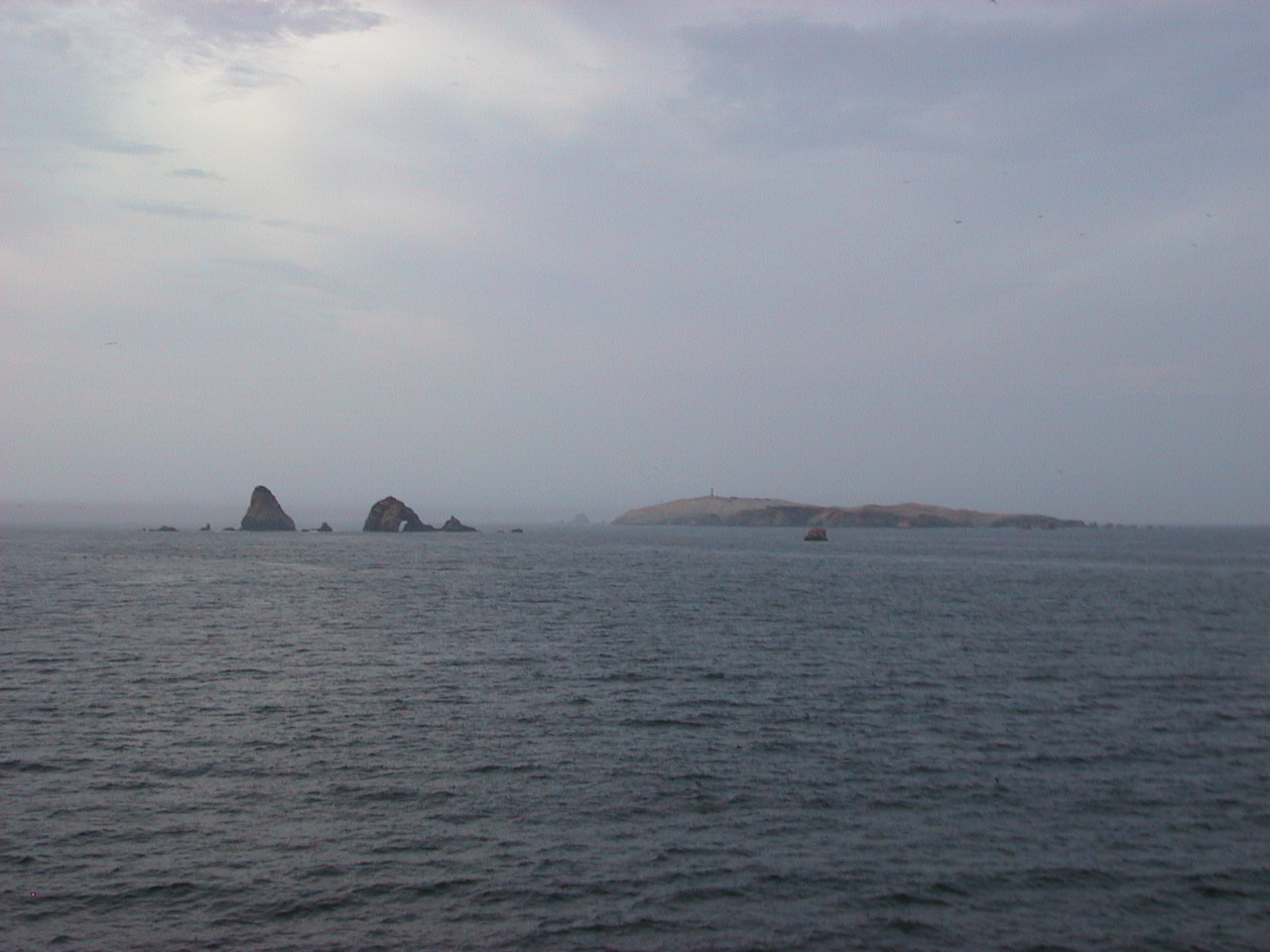
- Partial view of the islands.

- Location within Peru

Geography
- Location: Pacific Ocean
- Coordinates: 13°38′24″S 76°24′0″W
- Major islands: Chincha Norte, Chincha Centro, Chincha Sur

Administration
- Peru
- Region: Ica Region

Additional information
- Time zone: PET (UTC-5)

The Chincha Islands (Spanish: Islas Chincha) are a group of three small islands 21 kilometres (13 mi; 11 nmi) off the southwest coast of Peru, to which they belong, near the town of Pisco. Since pre-Incan times they were of interest for their extensive guano deposits, but the supplies were mostly exhausted by 1874.

== Geography ==
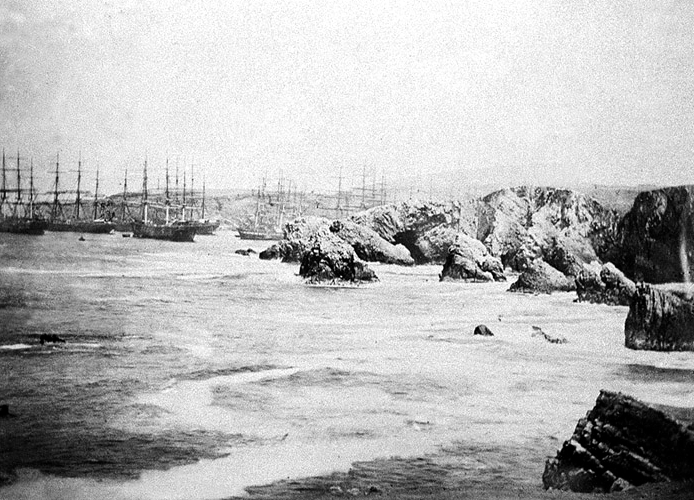
The Chincha Islands in 1866.

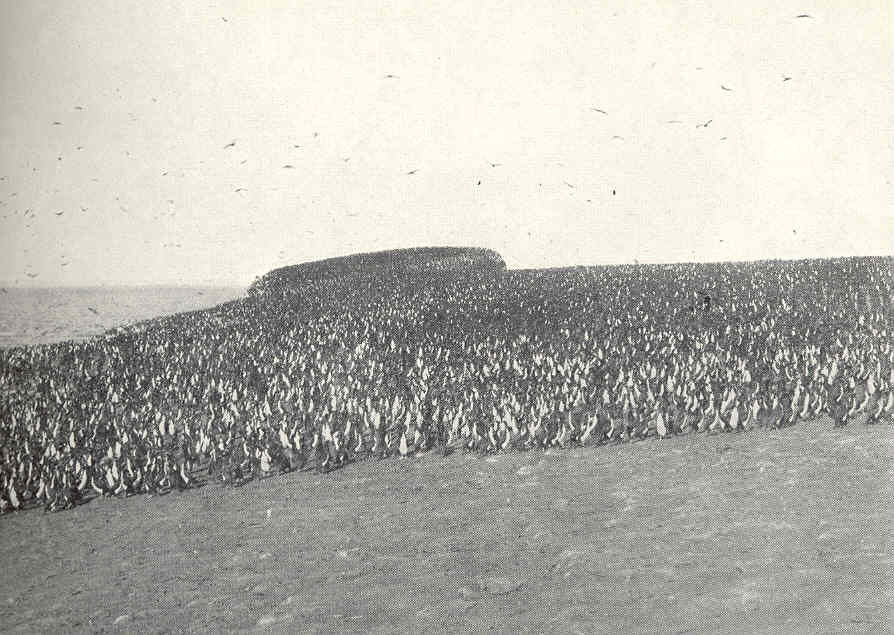
Cormorants on South Chincha Island in 1910.

The largest of the islands, Isla Chincha Norte (English:North Chincha Island), is 1.3 kilometres (0.8 mi) long and up to 1.0 kilometre (0.6 mi) wide, and rises to a height of 34 metres (112 ft). Isla Chincha Centro (English:Center Chincha Island) is almost the same size as its neighbour to the north, while Isla Chincha Sur (English:South Chincha Island) is half the size of its neighbours. The islands are mostly granite, and bordered with cliffs on all sides, upon which great numbers of seabirds nest.

== History ==
The Chincha Islands were once the residence of the Chincha people, but only a few remains are to be found today. Peru began the export of guano in 1840. Guano mining was done largely with Chinese coolie labor in horrific conditions: in 1860, it was calculated that of the 4,000 coolies brought to the Chinchas since the trade began, not one had survived.

Spain, which did not recognize Peru's independence until 1879 and desired the guano profits, occupied the islands in April 1864, setting off the Chincha Islands War (1864–1866).

== In literature ==
The Chincha Islands were featured in an 1854 book by the American author George Washington Peck titled Melbourne, and the Chincha Islands: With Sketches of Lima, and a Voyage Round the World. The book chronicled Peck's time spent in Melbourne, Australia, as well as the Chincha Islands.

Chapter L of Mark Twain's novel Roughing It also mentions the Chincha Islands. In the novel, Captain Ned Blakely, a San Francisco sea captain, sails to the Chincha Islands in command of a guano ship.

== See also ==
- Chinese coolies in the Chincha Islands
- Guano Islands, Islets, and Capes National Reserve System
