= Asia Island (Peru) =

Island in Peru

Isla Asia (Spanish)
- Location within Peru

Geography
- Location: Pacific Ocean
- Coordinates: 12°47′33.1″S 76°37′21.5″W
- Area: 1.52 km^{2} (0.59 sq mi)

Administration
- Peru
- Region: Lima

Additional information
- Time zone: PET (UTC-5)

Asia Island (Spanish: Isla de Asia, Isla Asia) is a Peruvian island on the Pacific Ocean off the coast of Cañete Province, region of Lima. It has a surface area of 152 ha (1.52 km²); and a maximum elevation of 123 m (404 ft).

== See also ==
- Guano Islands, Islets, and Capes National Reserve System
