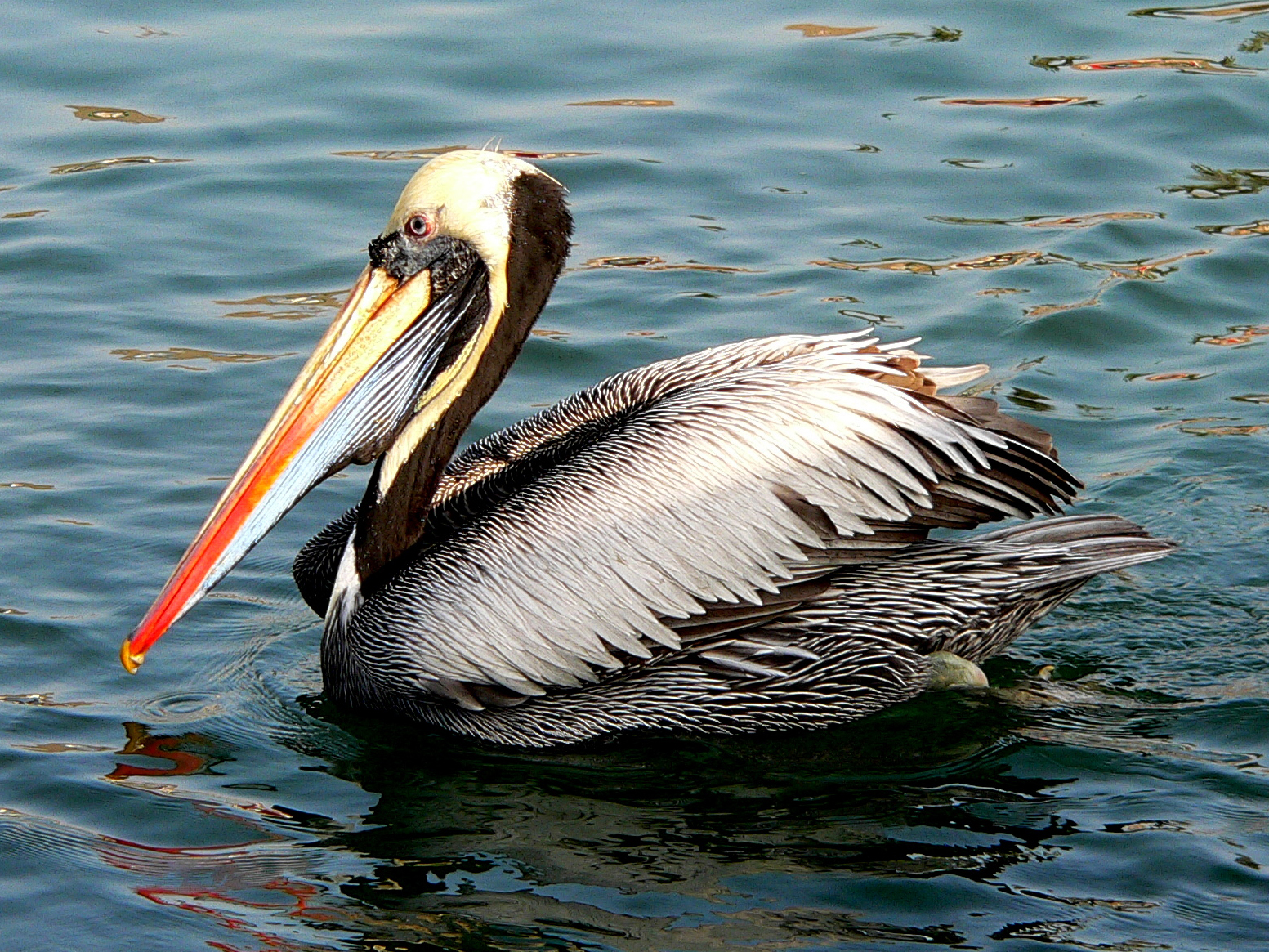

Conservation status
- Near Threatened (IUCN 3.1)

Scientific classification
- Kingdom: Animalia
- Phylum: Chordata
- Class: Aves
- Order: Pelecaniformes
- Family: Pelecanidae
- Genus: Pelecanus
- Species: P. thagus

Binomial name
- Pelecanus thagus Molina, 1782

Synonyms
- Pelecanus occidentalis thagus Molina, 1782; Pelecanus barbieri Oustalet, 1878

= Peruvian pelican =

Species of bird

The Peruvian pelican (Pelecanus thagus) is a member of the pelican family. It lives on the west coast of South America, breeding in loose colonies from about 33.5 degrees south in central Chile to Piura in northern Peru, and occurring as a visitor in southern Chile and Ecuador. It used to be considered a subspecies of the brown pelican.

== Description ==
These birds are dark in colour with a white stripe from the top of the bill up to the crown and down the sides of the neck. They have long tufted feathers on the top of their heads. It was previously considered a subspecies of the brown pelican (Pelecanus occidentalis). The Peruvian pelican is considerably larger, ranging from about 5 to 7 kg (11–15 lb) in weight, 137 to 152 cm (4.5–5.0 ft) in length and with a wingspan of about 228 cm (7.5 ft). Compared to the brown pelican, it also has proportionally longer crest feathers, as well as differences in the colours of the gular pouch, beak, scapulars and greater wing coverts.

== Behaviour ==
=== Breeding ===
The main breeding season occurs from September to March. Clutch size is usually two or three eggs. Eggs are incubated for approximately 4 to 5 weeks, with the rearing period lasting about 3 months.

Breeding occurs in large coastal colonies.

=== Feeding ===
Peruvian pelicans feed on several species of fish. Unlike the brown pelican, they never dive from a great height to catch its food, instead diving from a shallow height or feeding while swimming on the surface. On occasion they may take other food items, such as nestling of imperial shags, young Peruvian diving petrels, gray gulls and cannibalize unrelated chicks of their own species. They also feed on pelagic species such as anchovies. In fact, those in the northern Humboldt Current System feed almost exclusively on one species, the Peruvian anchoveta.

The birds feed around cold-water upwellings, being found along the Humboldt Current.

== Conservation ==
Its status was first evaluated for the IUCN Red List in 2008, being listed as Near threatened. Its status was reassessed in 2018, and it was again listed as Near threatened, but with increasing population.

One factor affecting their status may be competition with fishing industries for anchovies, a primary food source for the species.

== Gallery ==
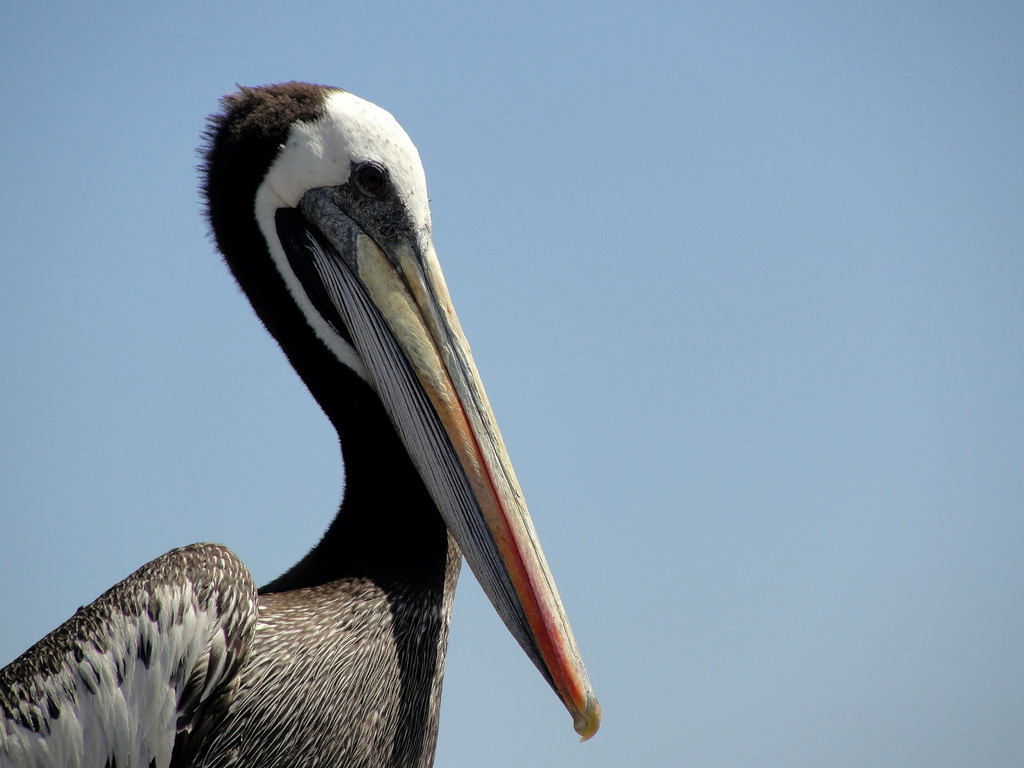
Peruvian pelican in Pan de Azúcar National Park, Chile

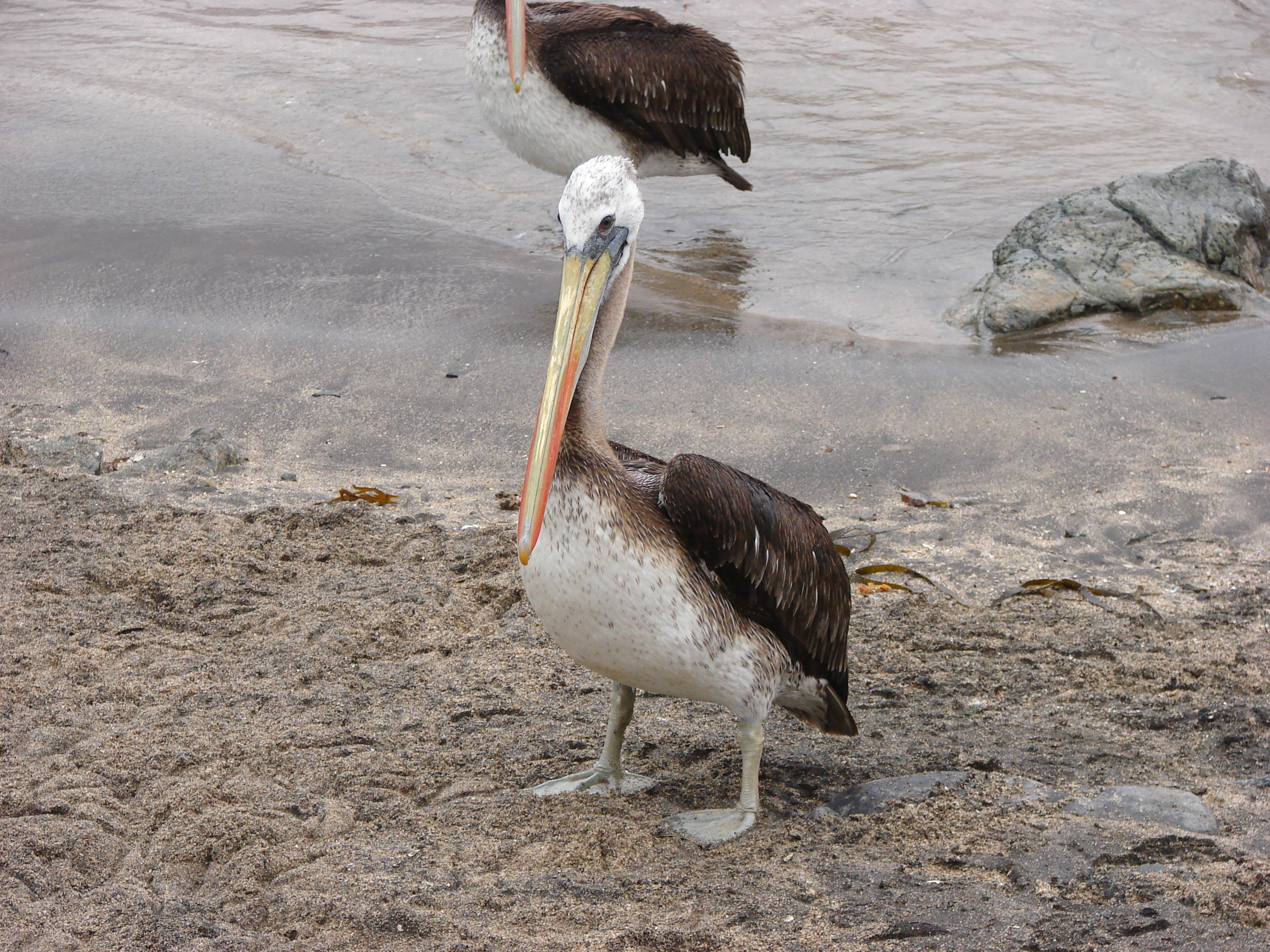
Peruvian pelican in Pan de Azúcar National Park, Chile

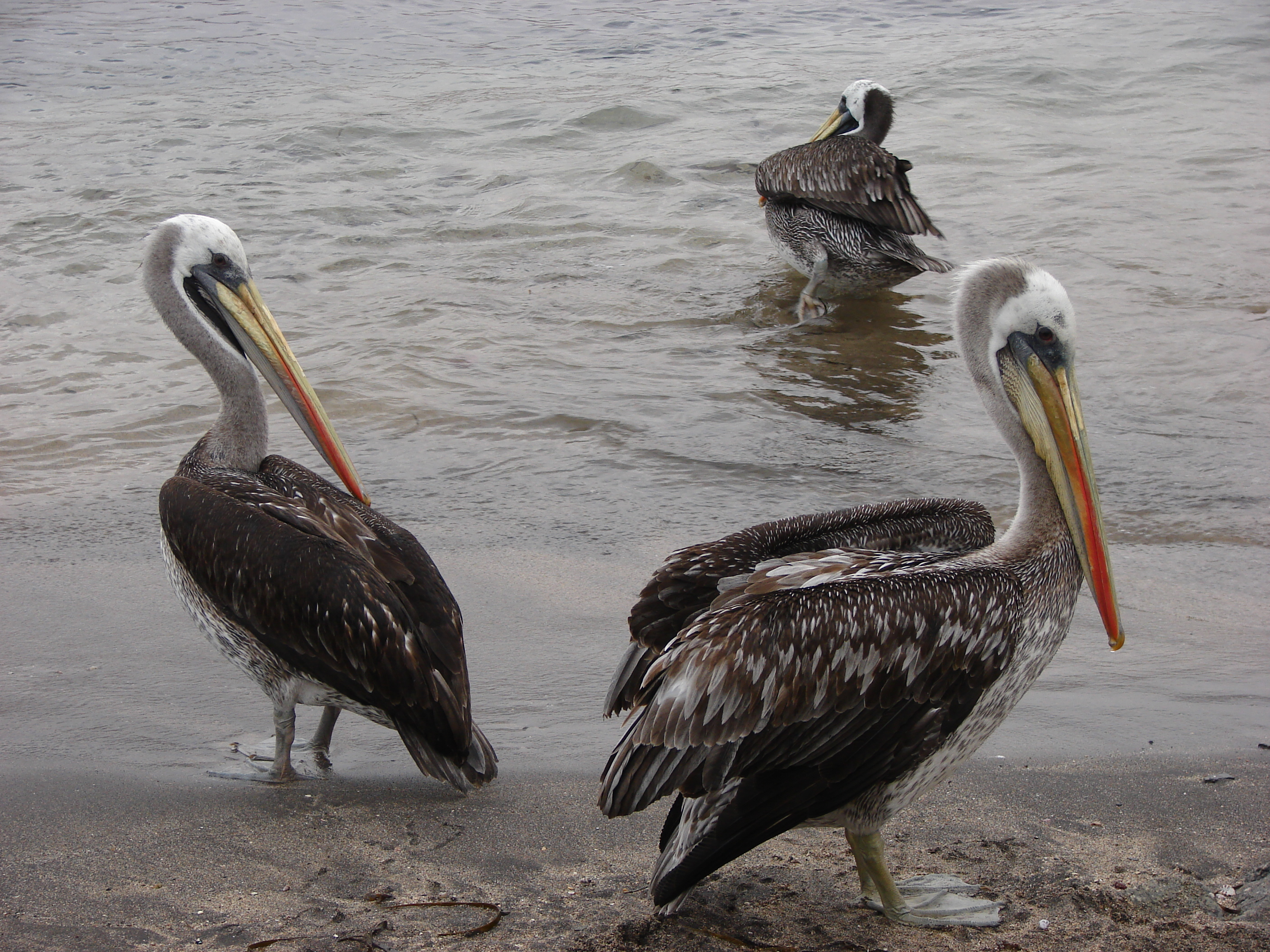
Several Peruvian pelicans at the Caleta Pan de Azúcar fishing village in Pan de Azúcar National Park, Chile

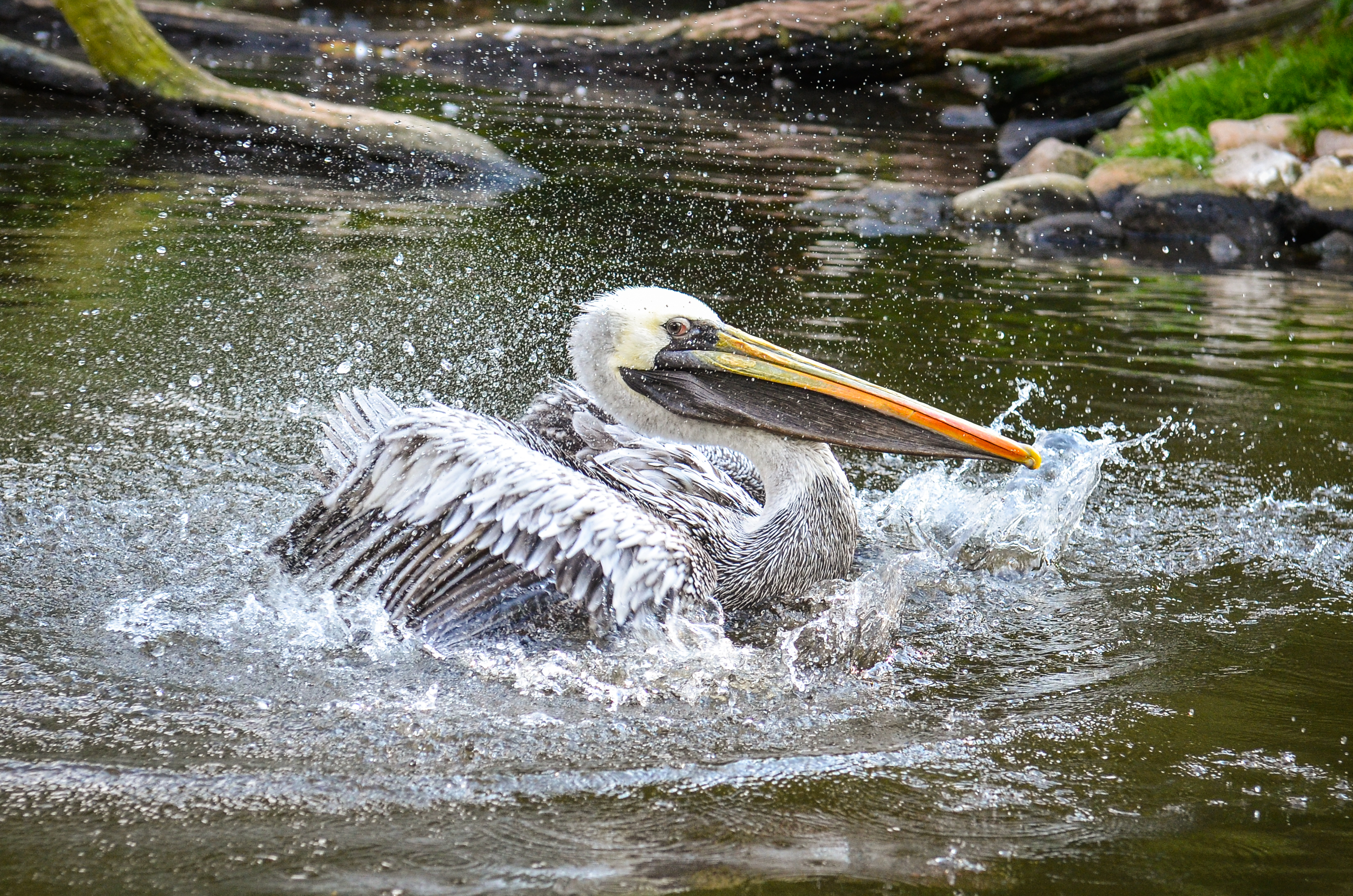
A Peruvian pelican takes a bath at Weltvogelpark Walsrode, Germany

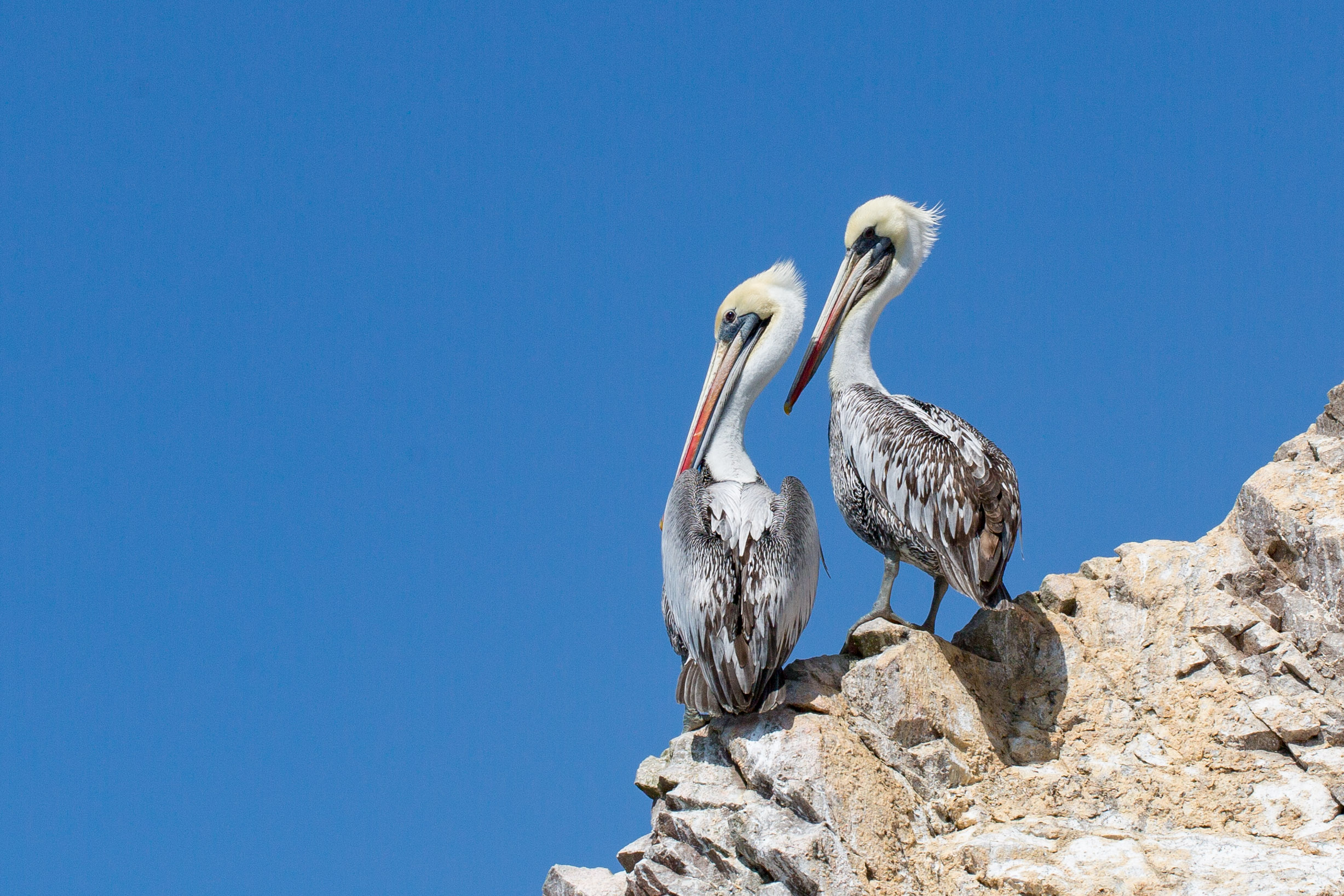
Peruvian pelicans in the Ballestas Islands, Peru

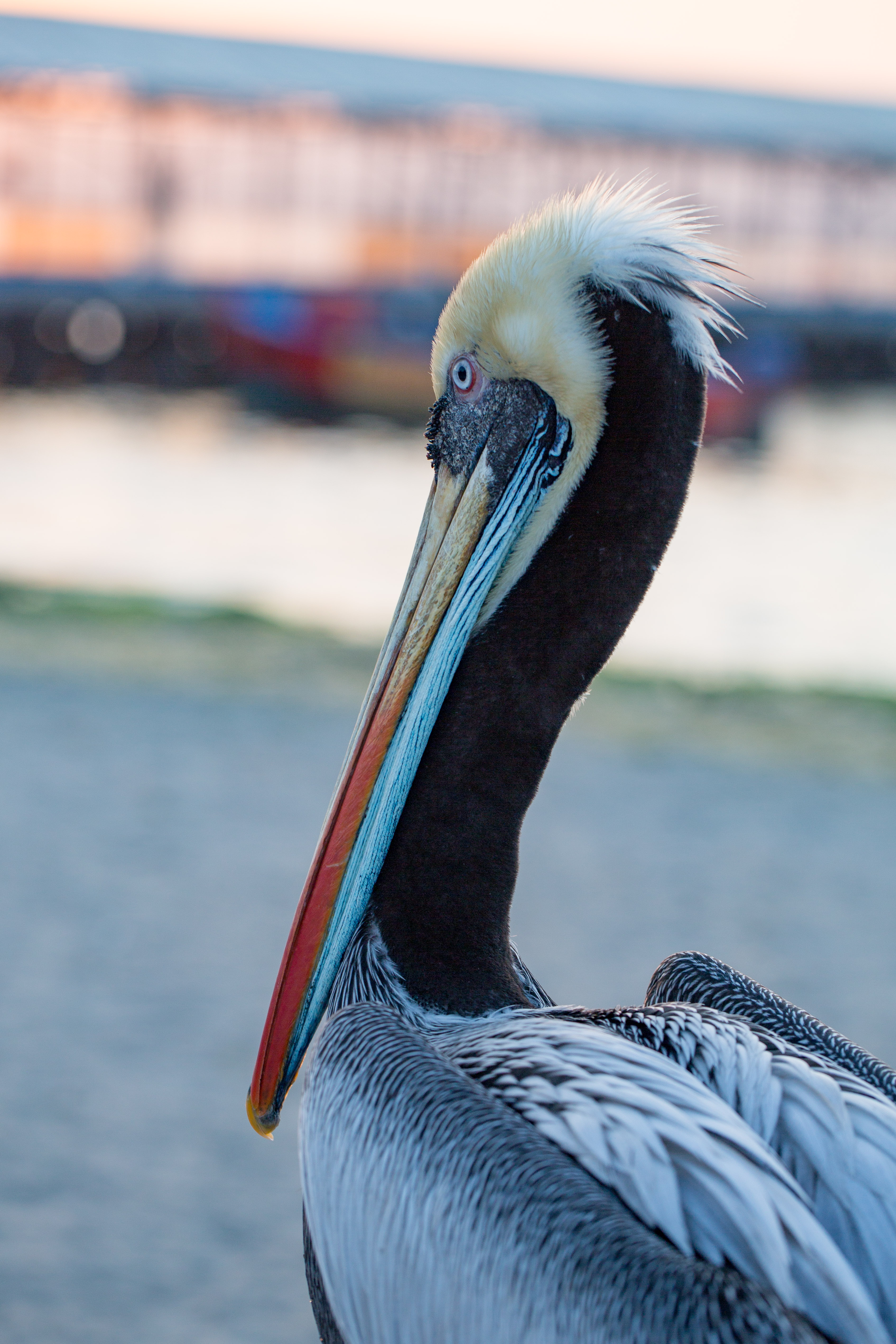
Peruvian pelican in Paracas, Peru

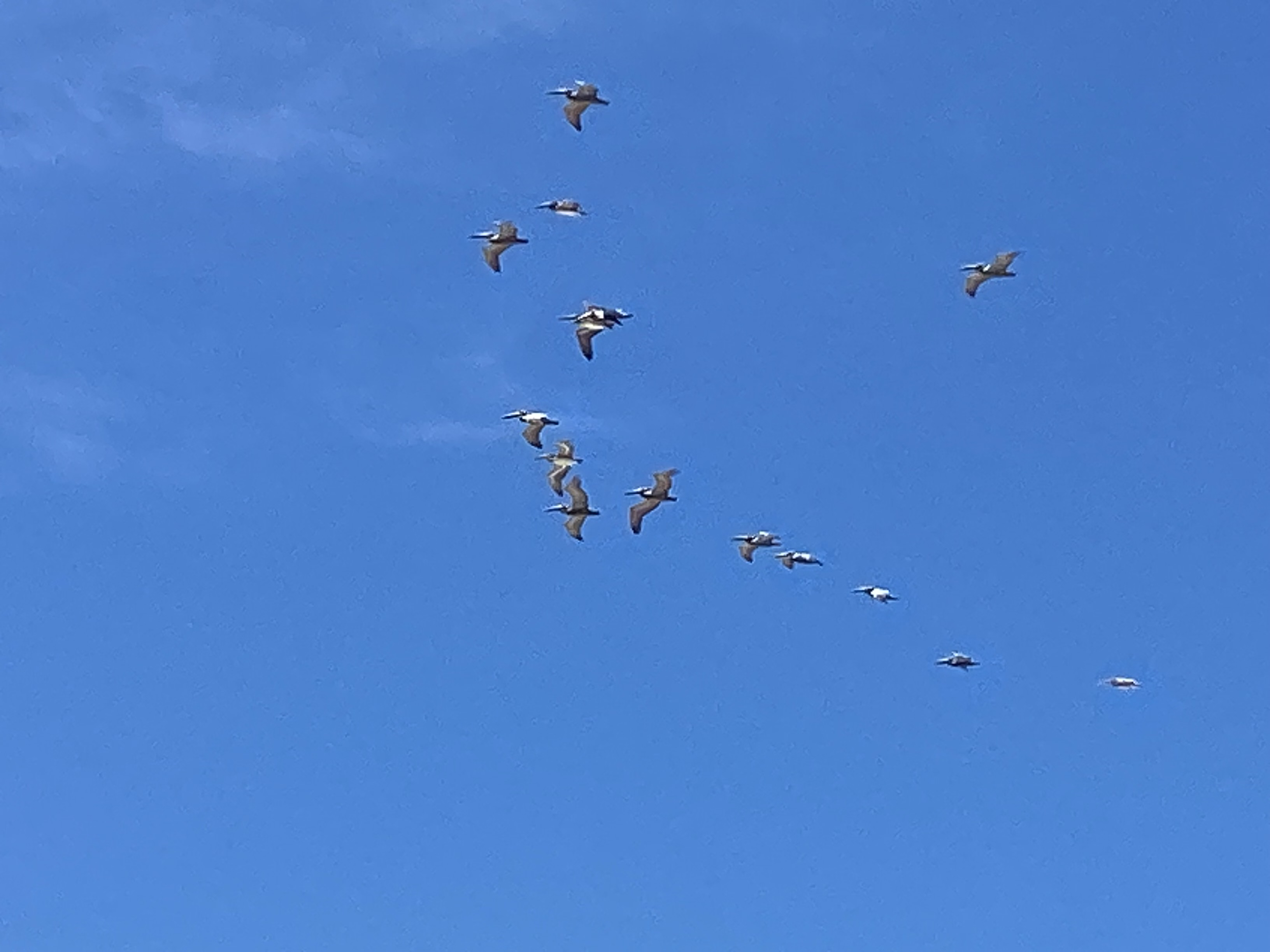
Pelecanus Thagus Flying above, Punta Sal, Peru
