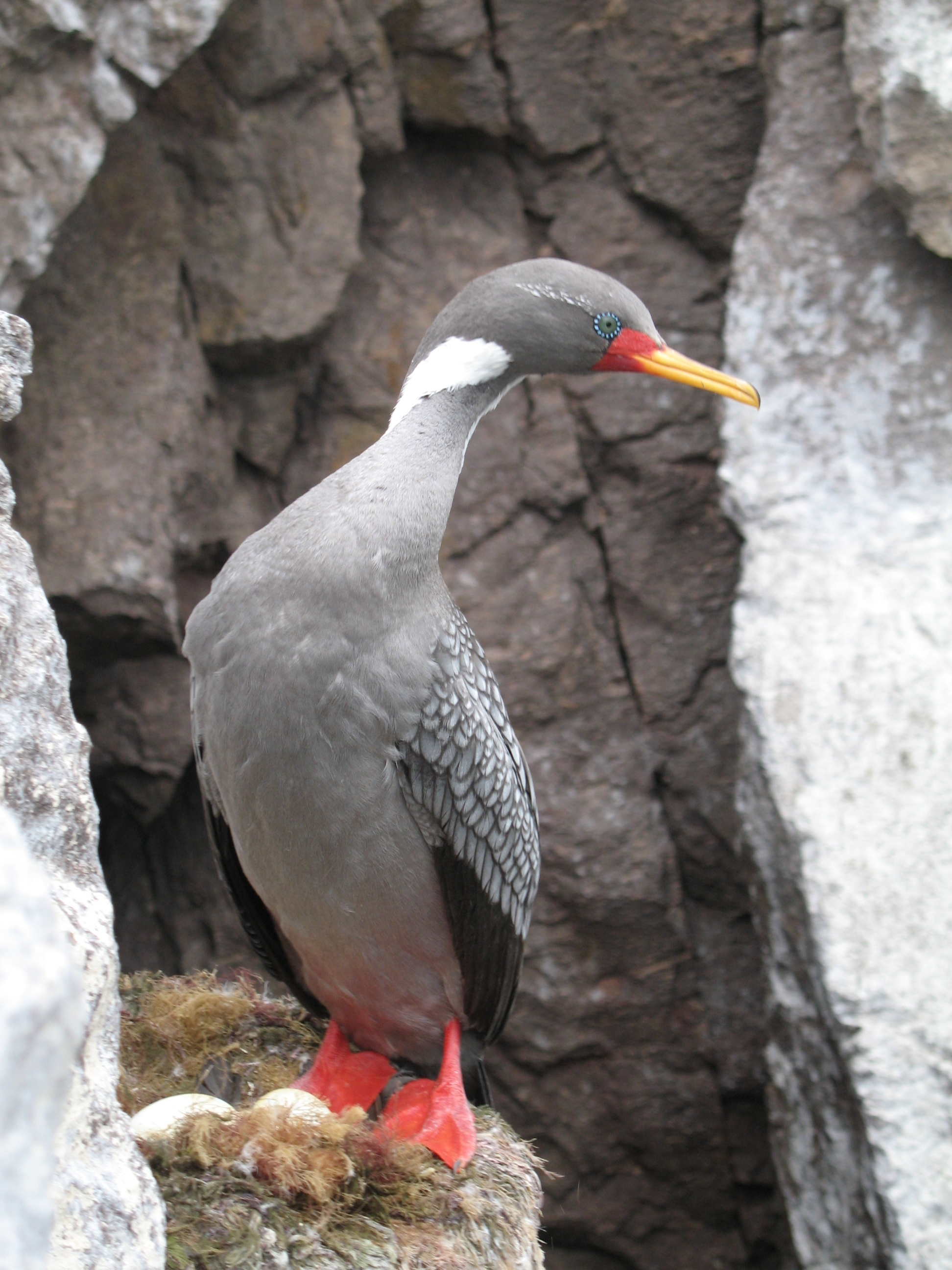

Conservation status
- Near Threatened (IUCN 3.1)

Scientific classification
- Kingdom: Animalia
- Phylum: Chordata
- Class: Aves
- Order: Suliformes
- Family: Phalacrocoracidae
- Genus: Poikilocarbo; Boetticher, 1935
- Species: P. gaimardi

Binomial name
- Poikilocarbo gaimardi (Garnot, 1828)
- native range

= Red-legged cormorant =

Species of bird

The red-legged cormorant (Poikilocarbo gaimardi), also known as the red-legged shag, red-footed cormorant, red-footed shag, Gaimard's cormorant and grey cormorant, is a species of cormorant resident to the coastline of South America. It is the only member of the genus Poikilocarbo. It is non-colonial unlike most seabirds. The red-legged cormorant has not been observed wing-spreading, which is unusual among cormorant species.

== Taxonomy ==
The red-legged cormorant was traditionally placed within the genus Phalacrocorax, but this assignment has been contested in recent years. Some phylogenetic studies have suggested that this species should be placed within Notocarbo, finding it to be most closely related to other southern-hemisphere shags, such as the spotted shag. A 2014 study found it to represent the second most basal genus of cormorant, with only Microcarbo being more basal, and thus reclassified into the genus Poikilocarbo. This classification was followed by the IOC in 2021. It has been suggested that the population of red-legged cormorants on the Atlantic coast are a separate subspecies. They are slightly smaller and have marginally paler plumage compared to the birds of the Pacific coast.

Poikilocarbo is thought to have diverged from the rest of the Phalacrocoracidae between 12.0 - 13.5 million years ago.

== Description ==
The red-legged cormorant is a medium-sized seabird, with a long neck, streamlined body, webbed feet and a long, thin hooked bill. Its body length is 71–76 centimetres (28–30 in), with an average wingspan of 91 cm (36 in). It weighs 1.3–1.5 kilograms (2.9–3.3 lb). There is no sexual dimorphism between the male and female birds.

The red-legged cormorant's appearance is unmistakable. Breeding adults have a smoky grey body, with a slightly paler underside. They have scattered areas of white filoplumes behind the eyes and down the neck. The wing coverts have a speckled, silvery grey appearance, followed by broad black wing tips. The tail is also black. The eyes are green, surrounded by sixteen tiny blue marks. The bill is yellow, shading to orange toward the base, the gular skin is a vibrant orange or red. The legs and feet are a striking coral red.

Non-breeding adults look similar to breeding adults. They lack the white filoplumes, the wing coverts appear less silvery, but more dark grey, and the bill and gular skin are duller in colouration.

Juvenile red-legged cormorants usually possess paler, brown plumage with a speckling of white around the throat. Juvenile plumage colouration can be highly variable between the Atlantic and Pacific coasts. Their eyes are grey and their bills and gular skin range from black to orange. The legs and feet can be a dull orange to a reddish black.

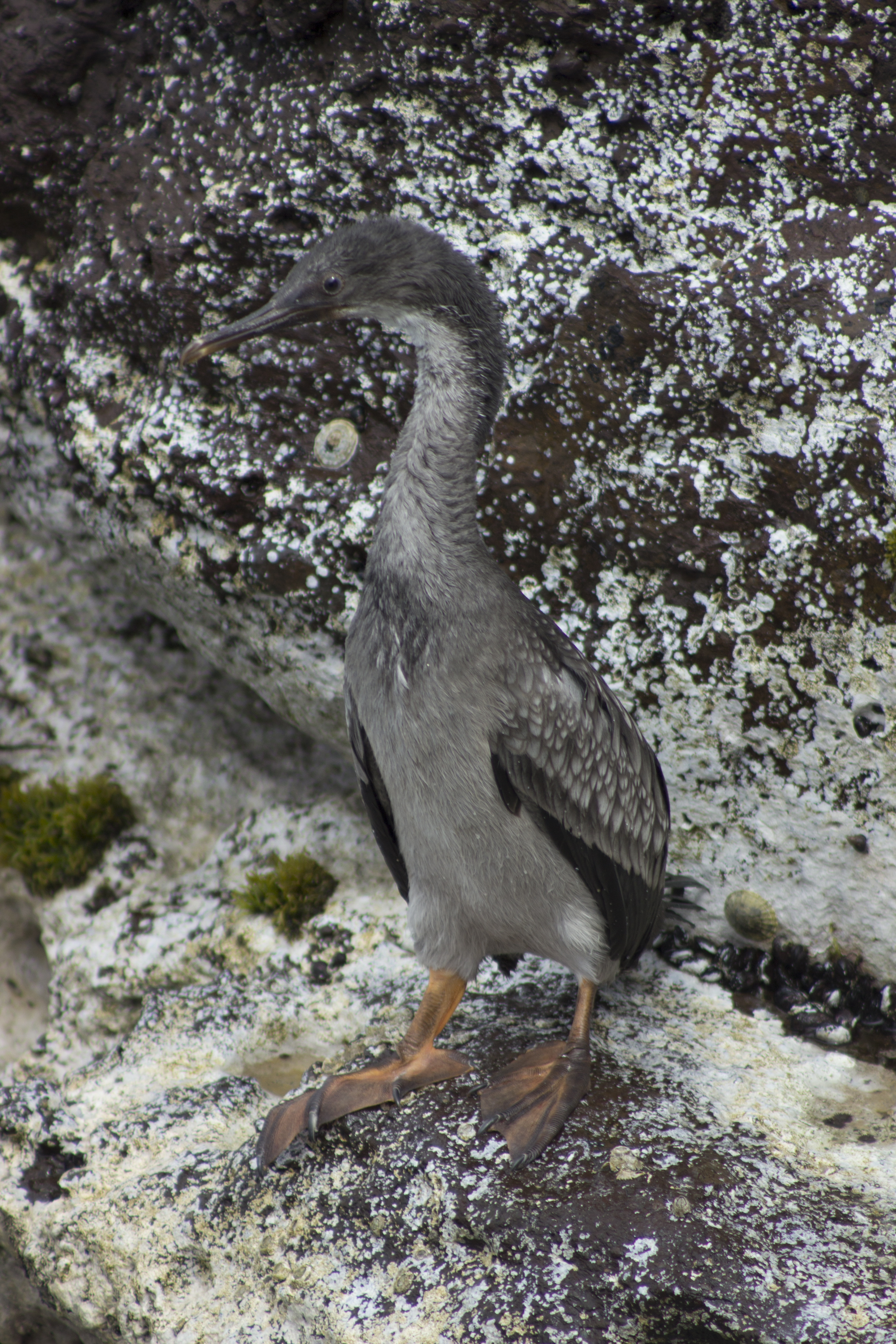
immature

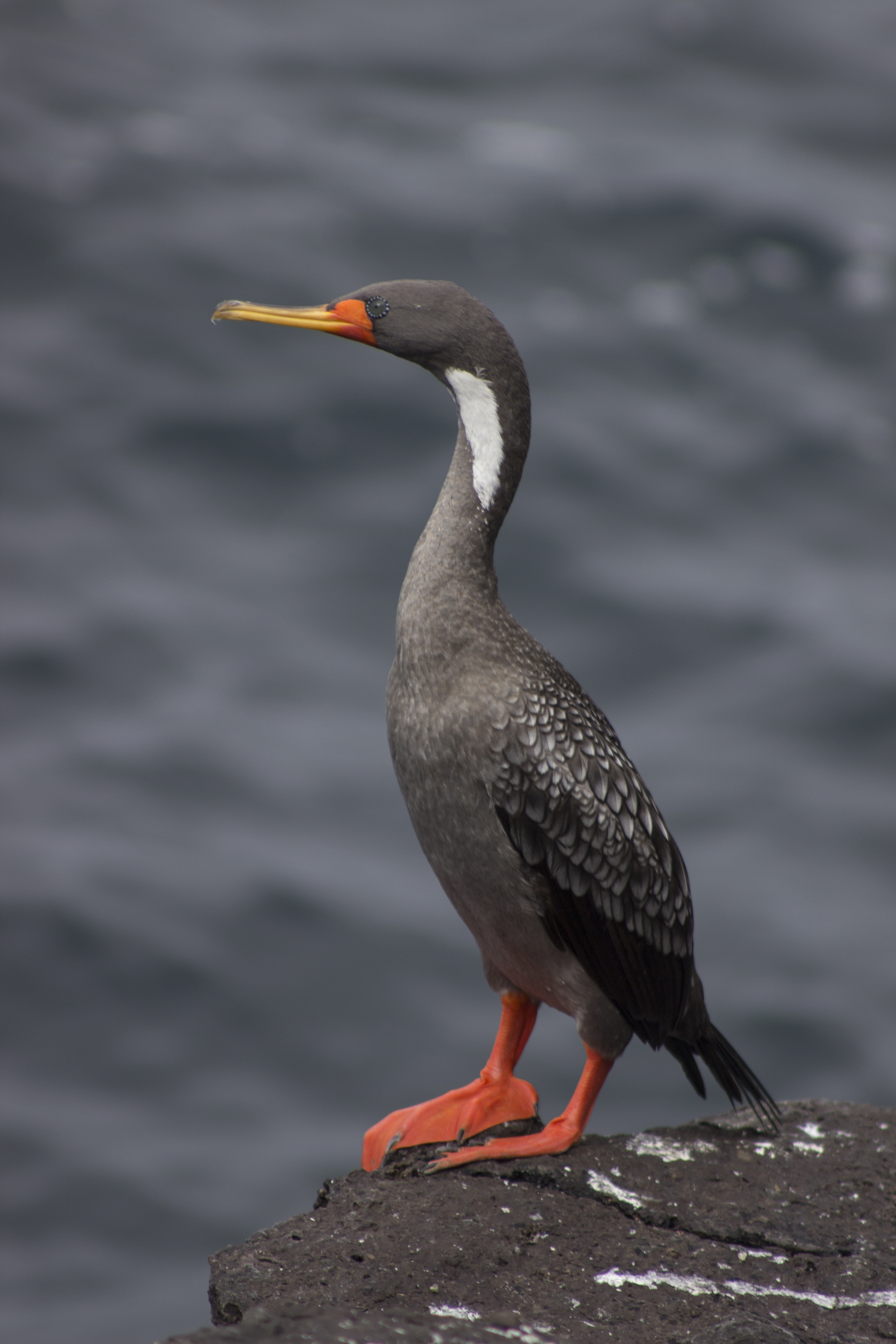
adult

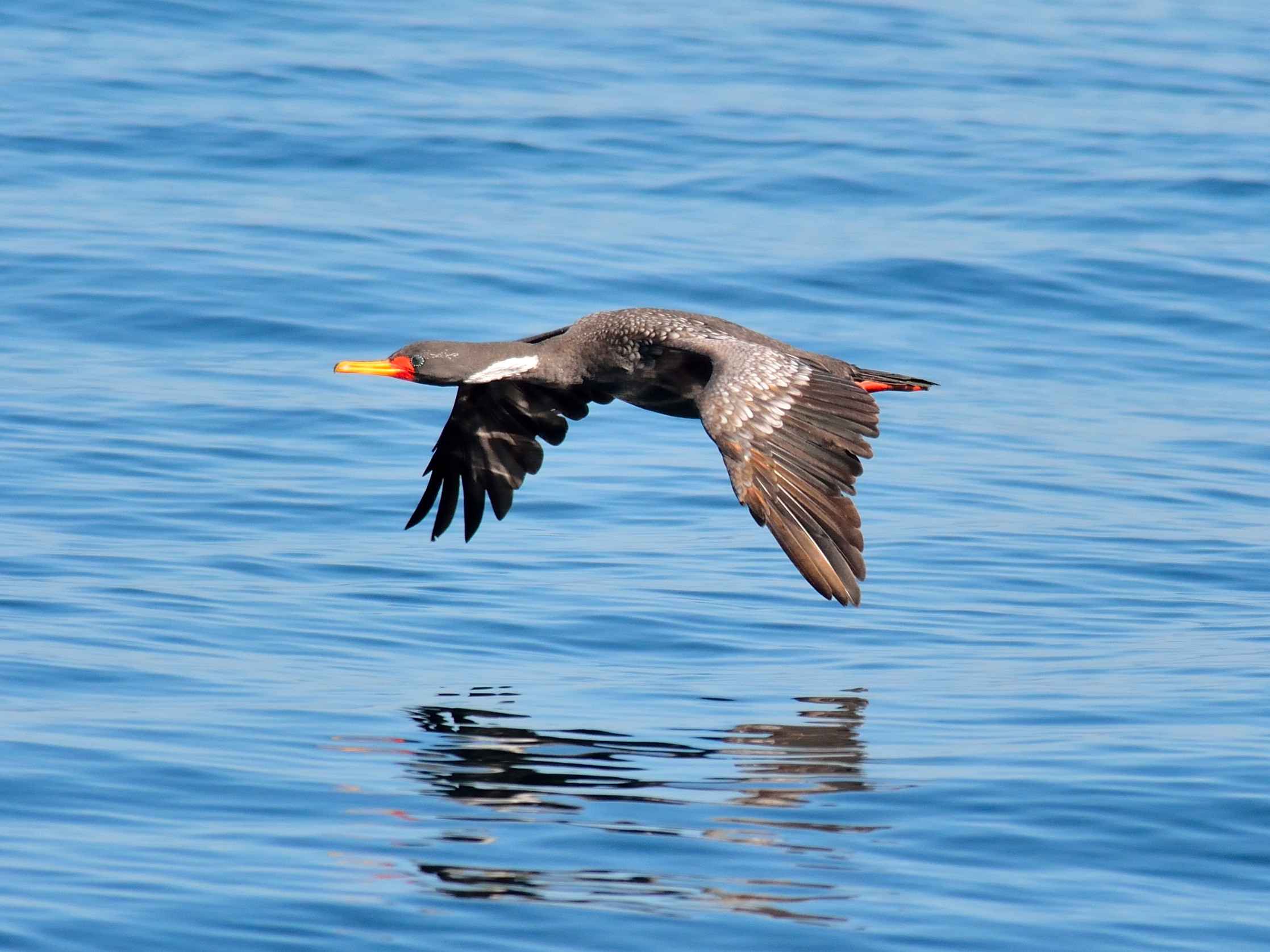
in flight in Chiloé, Chile

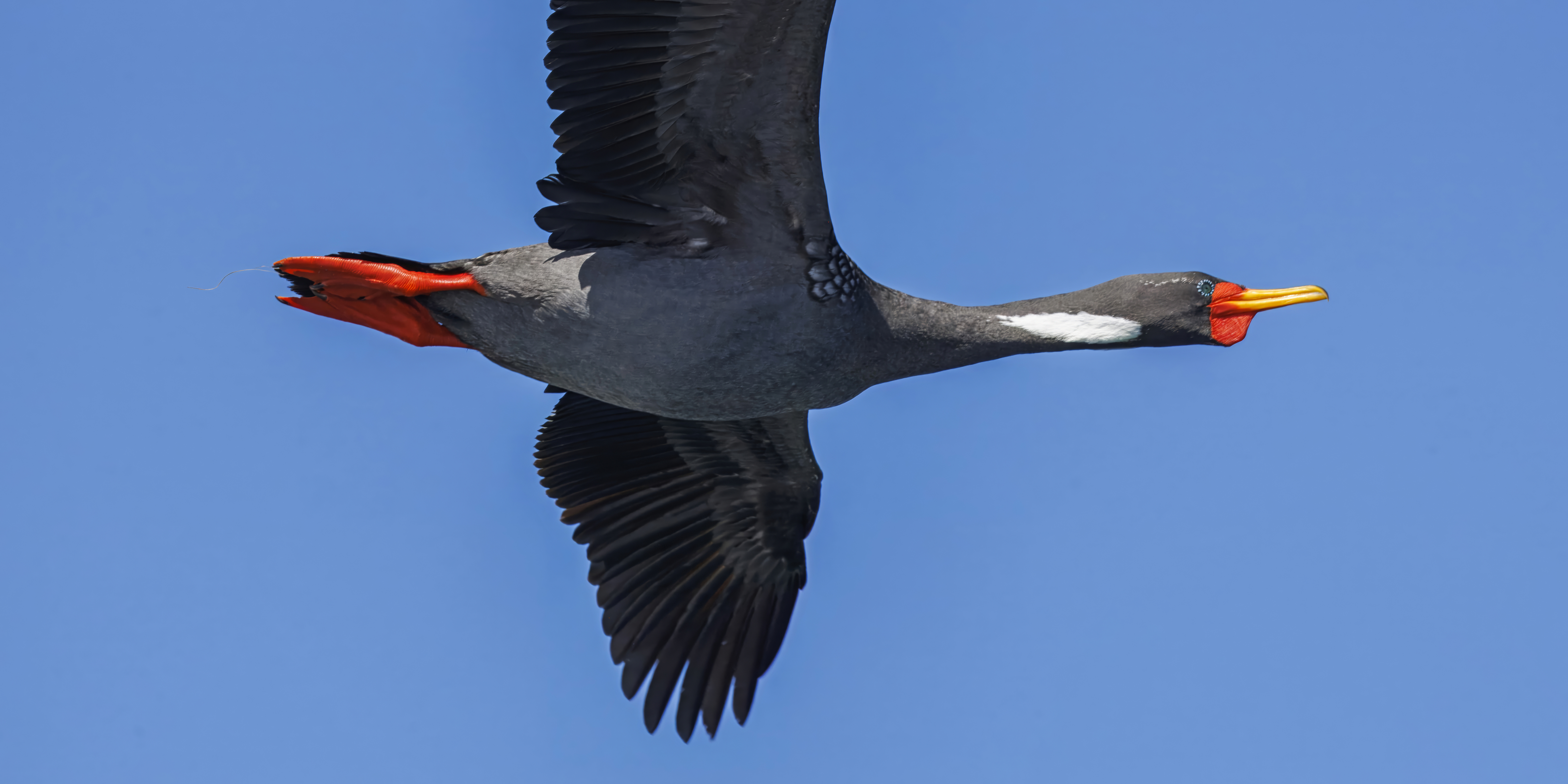
in flight in Chiloé, Chile

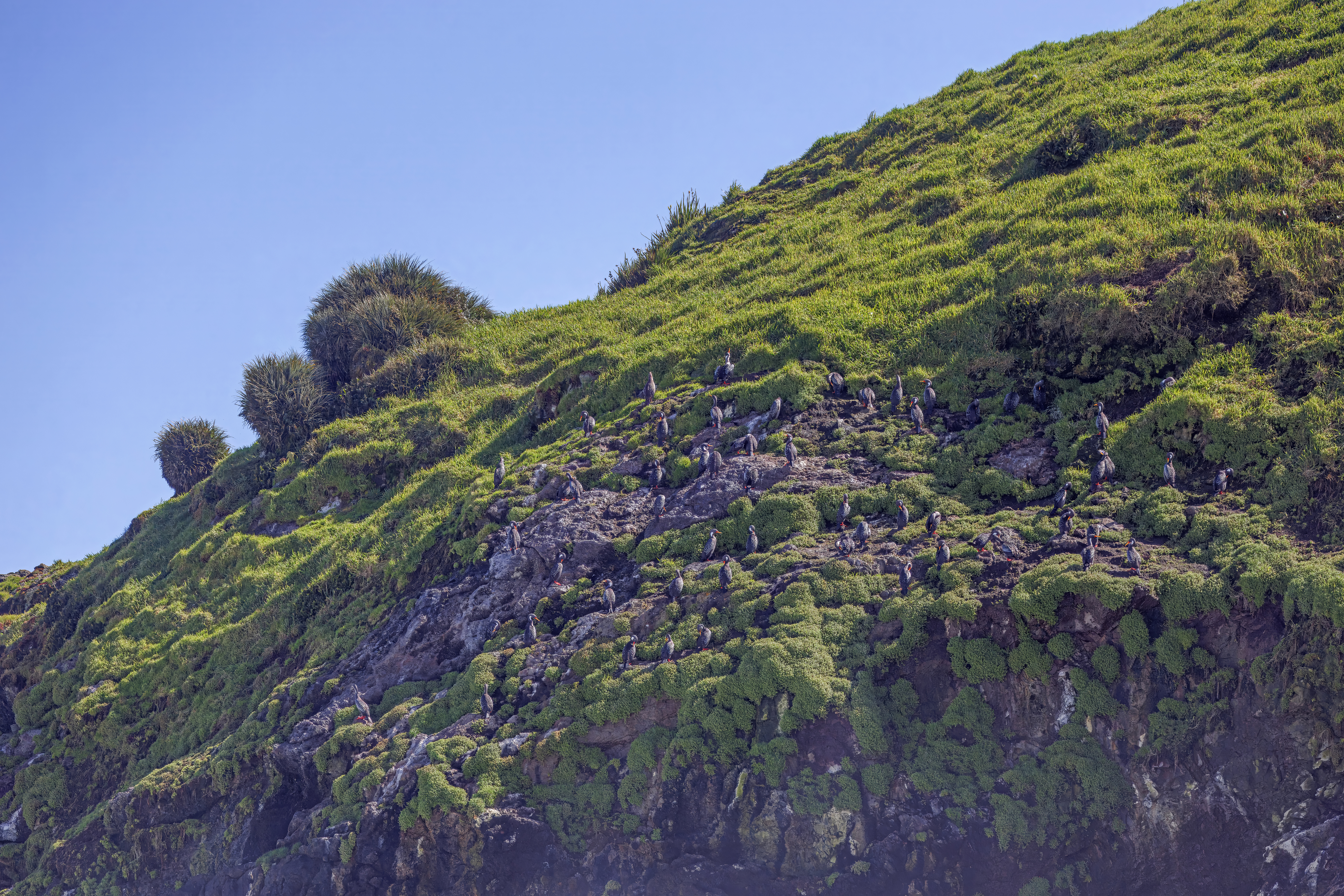
colony on Chiloé

== Distribution and habitat ==
The red-legged cormorant is native to the coast of South America. On the Pacific coast it ranges from Macabi Island, Peru to Chiloe Island, Chile. There are small isolated populations on the Atlantic coast scattered across Santa Cruz, Argentina. It rarely occurs further south than the Strait of Magellan.

Red-legged cormorants nest sparsely on steep rock faces, including coastal cliffs, rocky islets, and sea caverns. They become virtually undetectable against these rocky outcrops by their speckled grey plumage, with the exception of their colourful bills and feet. They forage within inshore bodies of water and in shallow offshore waters.

== Behaviour ==
=== Breeding ===
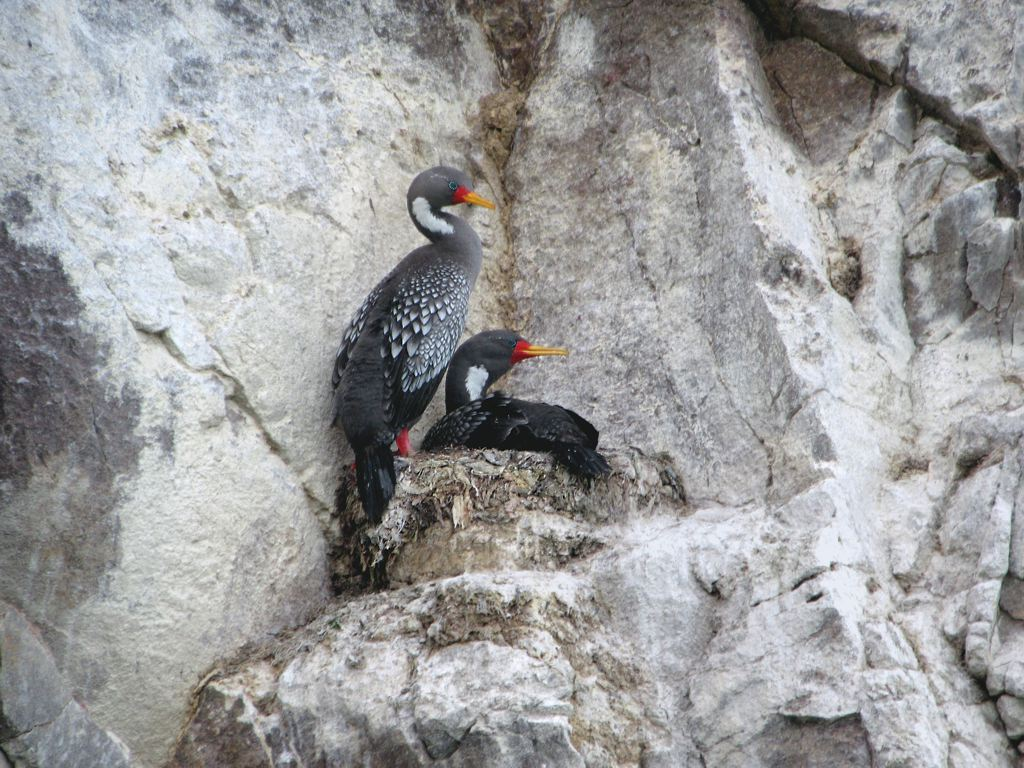
Red-legged cormorants nest on steep rock faces such as this cliff on the Rio Deseado near Puerto Deseado, Argentina.

The red-legged cormorant is a non-colonial seabird, instead living in pairs or small groups. Courtship typically occurs in January and February. The males can engage in elaborate mating displays, which include darting and throwback postures. During darting, males chirp quietly while moving the head back and forth exposing the interior of the mouth. When the female advances, the male displays a throwback posture; outstretching the neck and pointing the bill towards the tail. The female may respond to the male's display by hopping and throat clicking. When the female selects a male, periods of allopreening ensue, followed by copulation. Red-legged cormorant pairs are observed to be monogamous for at least one season.

Nests are constructed on steep cliffs and are usually isolated from other birds, but can form small colonies on rare occasions. They are composed of feathers, guano, seaweed, the cases of tube-dwelling worms and even garbage. They have been observed diving 8 to 10 meters collecting billfulls of various nesting materials. Egg laying takes place between October and January, with clutch sizes averaging three eggs. After hatching, the nestlings initially have no feathers, but are quickly covered in brownish down. As with all cormorants, nestlings are altricial, incubation period averages 30 days and the chick-rearing period is 60–70 days.

=== Feeding ===
Red-legged cormorants are generally solitary foragers, but hunting in pairs or small flocks may occur. Most red-legged cormorants forage no further than 3 km away from their nest. They hunt in inshore waters, including estuaries, and in shallow offshore waters. They never enter exclusively fresh water. Many red-legged cormorants forage at low tide, presumably to minimize their travel time to and from the surface and to maximize time searching for food. They can dive 8–10 metres (26–33 ft) below the surface in pursuit of prey. Their diet mainly consists of fish, specifically including eels, sprat, and anchovies, as well as planktonic crustaceans and squid.

=== Voice ===
The red-legged cormorants calls are unlike most seabirds; they consist of high-pitched chirps and chirrups more like a songbird.

== Status and conservation ==
The cormorant is considered to be Near Threatened on the IUCN Red List of Threatened Species.

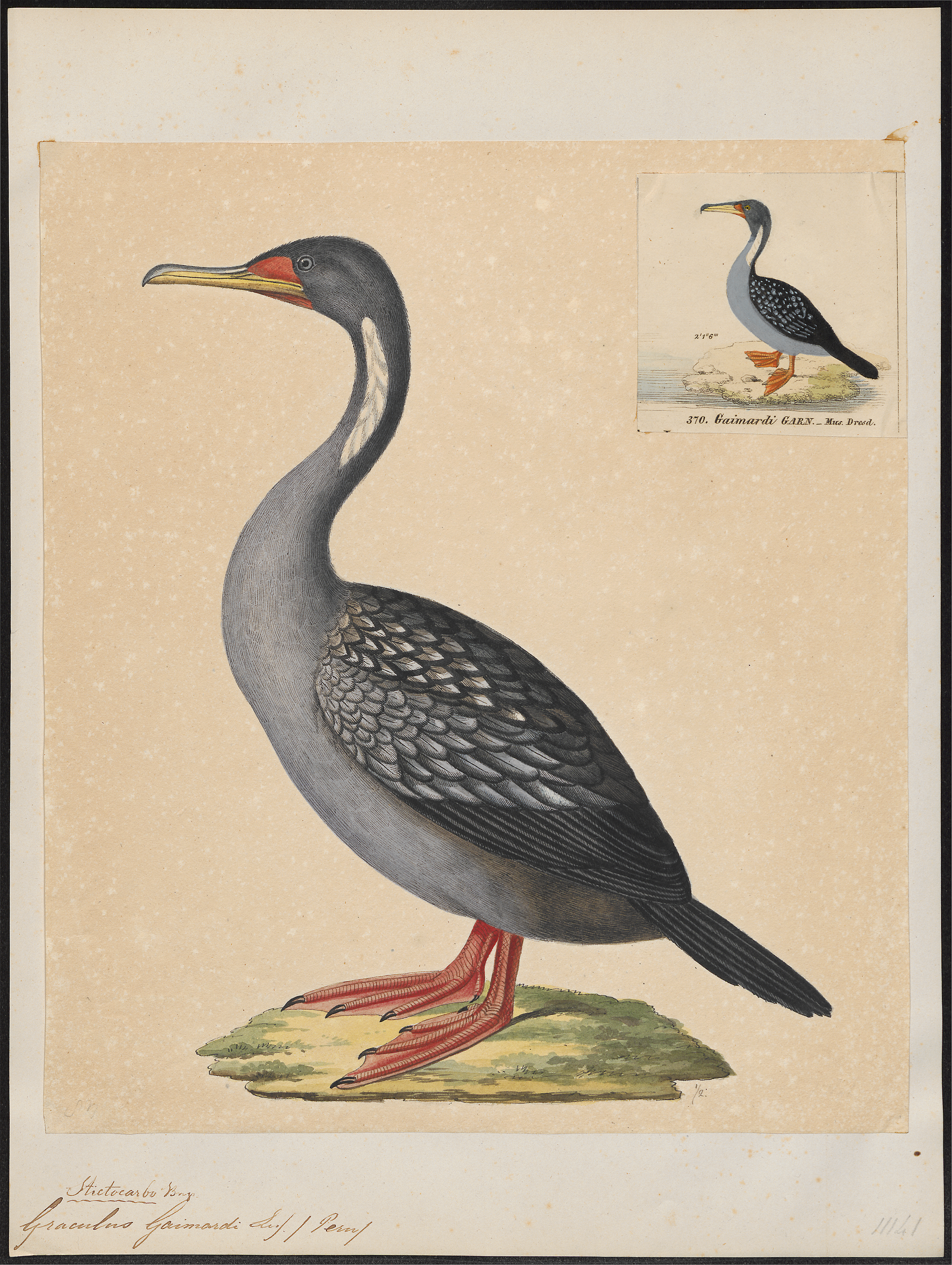
Red legged cormorant as Graculus gaimardi in print from Iconographia Zoologica 1825-1838

=== Predation ===
Due to the birds' habit of nesting on cliffs with sheer rock faces and no ground approach, they are inaccessible to most predators. Their main predators are kelp gulls, as well as humans, who consume adults, nestlings and eggs. The red-legged cormorant's threat display appears to be underdeveloped, consisting only of gaping and thrusting the bill towards the intruder. This could be due to its solitary life and lack of predators.
