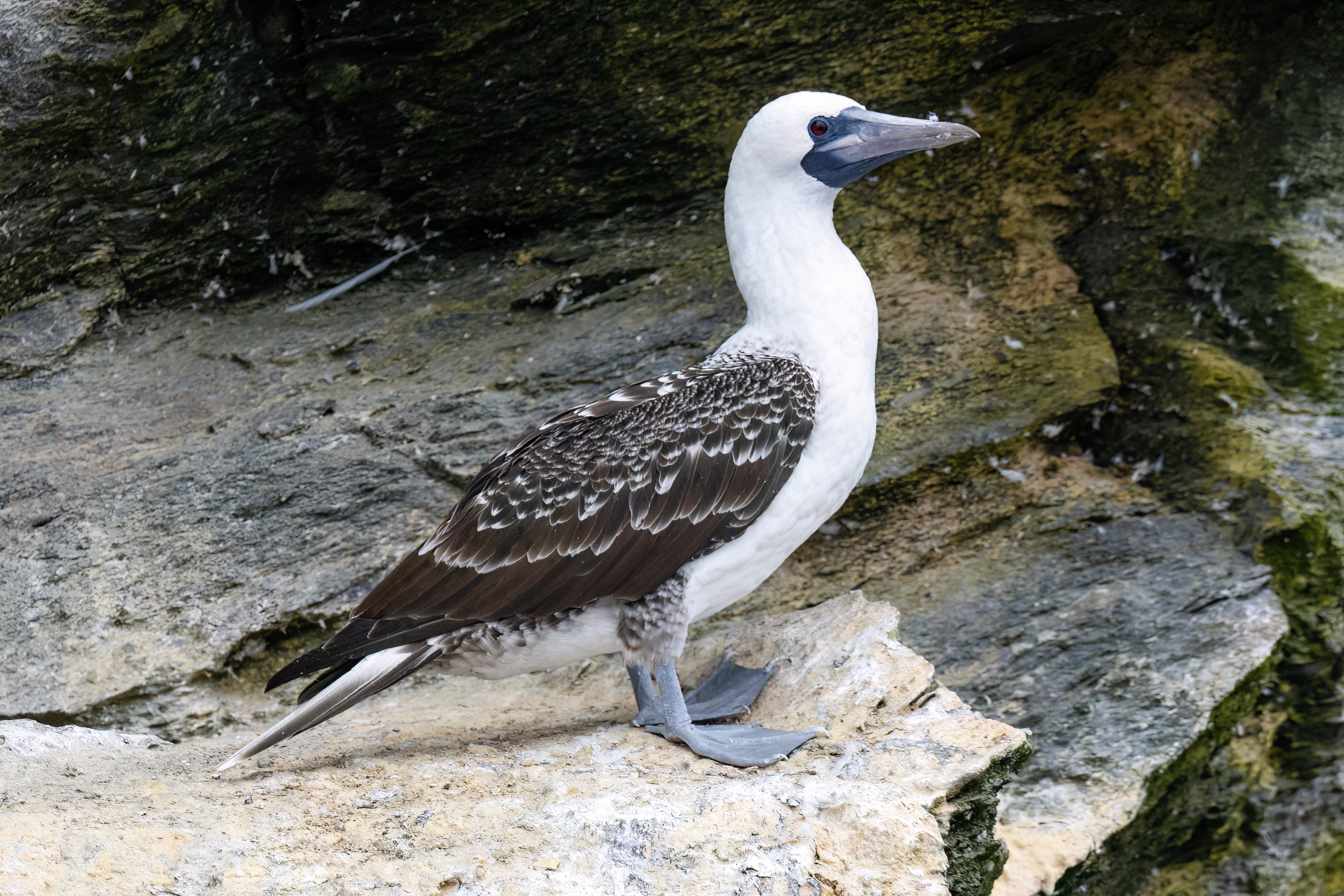

Conservation status
- Least Concern (IUCN 3.1)

Scientific classification
- Kingdom: Animalia
- Phylum: Chordata
- Class: Aves
- Order: Suliformes
- Family: Sulidae
- Genus: Sula
- Species: S. variegata

Binomial name
- Sula variegata (Tschudi, 1843)

= Peruvian booby =

Peruvian booby Temporal range: Miocene-recent 11.62–0 Ma

Species of bird

The Peruvian booby (Sula variegata) is an endemic bird of the Peruvian current, and an important predator of the marine community to which it belongs. Its distribution is much less widespread than other closely related booby species. It is the most abundant seabird species that inhabits the Peruvian coast and the second most important guano-producing seabird. During the mid-twentieth century, the Peruvian booby population reached 3 million birds.

== Description ==
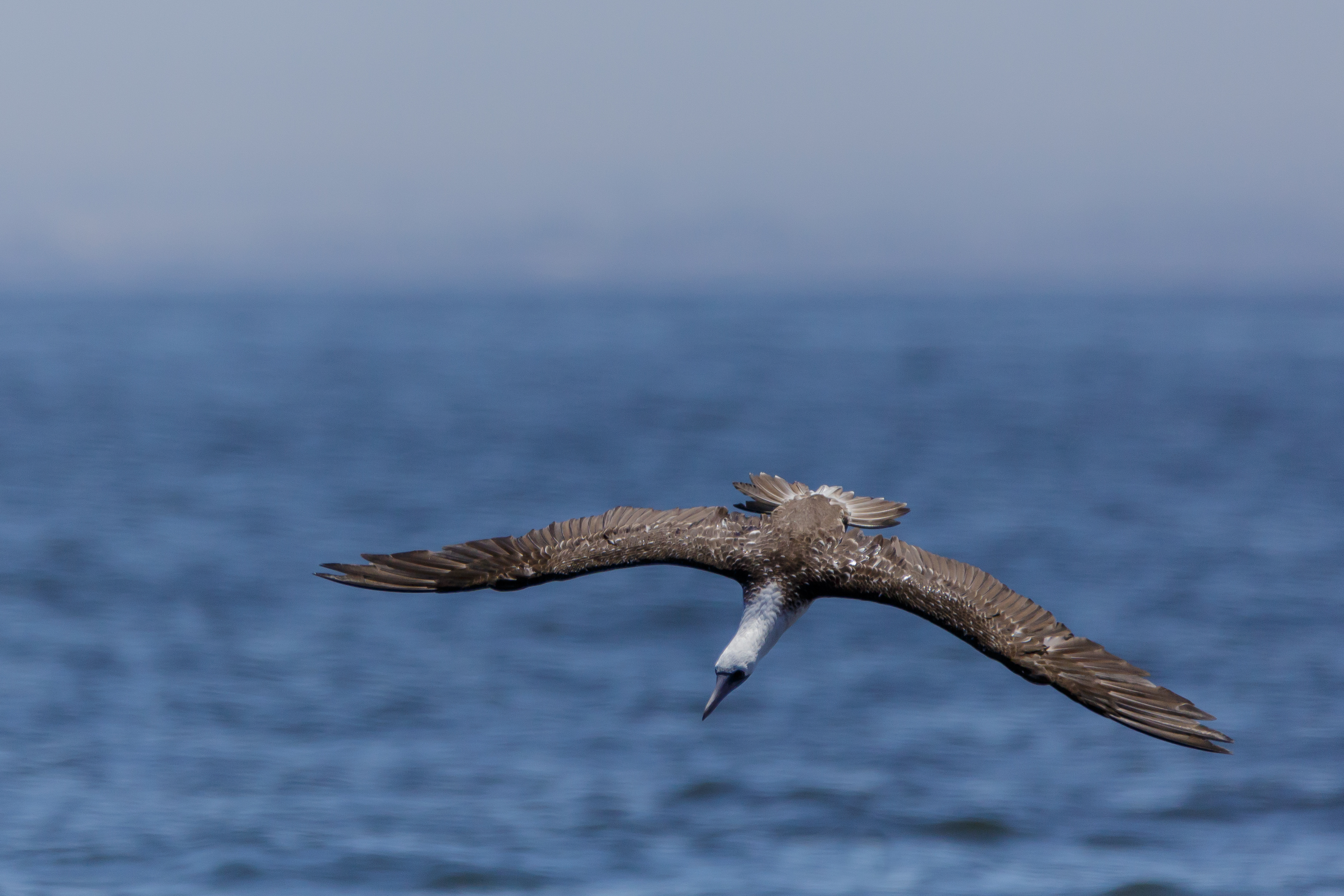
Showing the brown upperparts of the wings

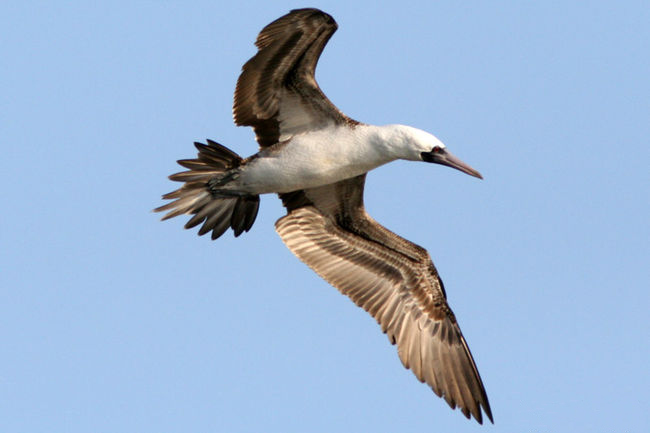
Showing the white underparts

The Peruvian booby has brown upperparts and a white head and underparts. There is noticeable white mottling on the upper side of the wings. Their wing-coverts are tipped white, creating a scale-like pattern. They have a long, pointed, grey bill and grey webbed feet. This differentiates them from characteristic coloring of the blue-footed and red-footed boobies. Female boobies tend to be larger than their male counterparts: their bodies an average of 19% heavier, and their wings 4% larger.

== Taxonomy ==
The Peruvian booby is within the genus Sula. It shares this genus with other boobies, including the blue-footed booby, the red-footed booby, the brown booby, the masked booby, and the Nazca booby.

There are no subspecies of Peruvian booby, but some members of the species have been seen to hybridize with blue-footed boobies.

== Habitat and distribution ==
The Peruvian booby is confined to the waters of the Humboldt current, off the coast of South America. They can be found off the shores of Peru, south to the middle part of Chile. Their abundance on the islands of Lobos de Tierra and Lobos de Afuera have resulted in a great deal of research being done on the species from these locations.

Their colonies nest on smooth, windswept sand flats that allow their nests to stay between a temperature range of approximately 28 °C to 38 °C. These salt flats, or pampas, allow for a fairly high density of booby nests.

== Behaviour ==
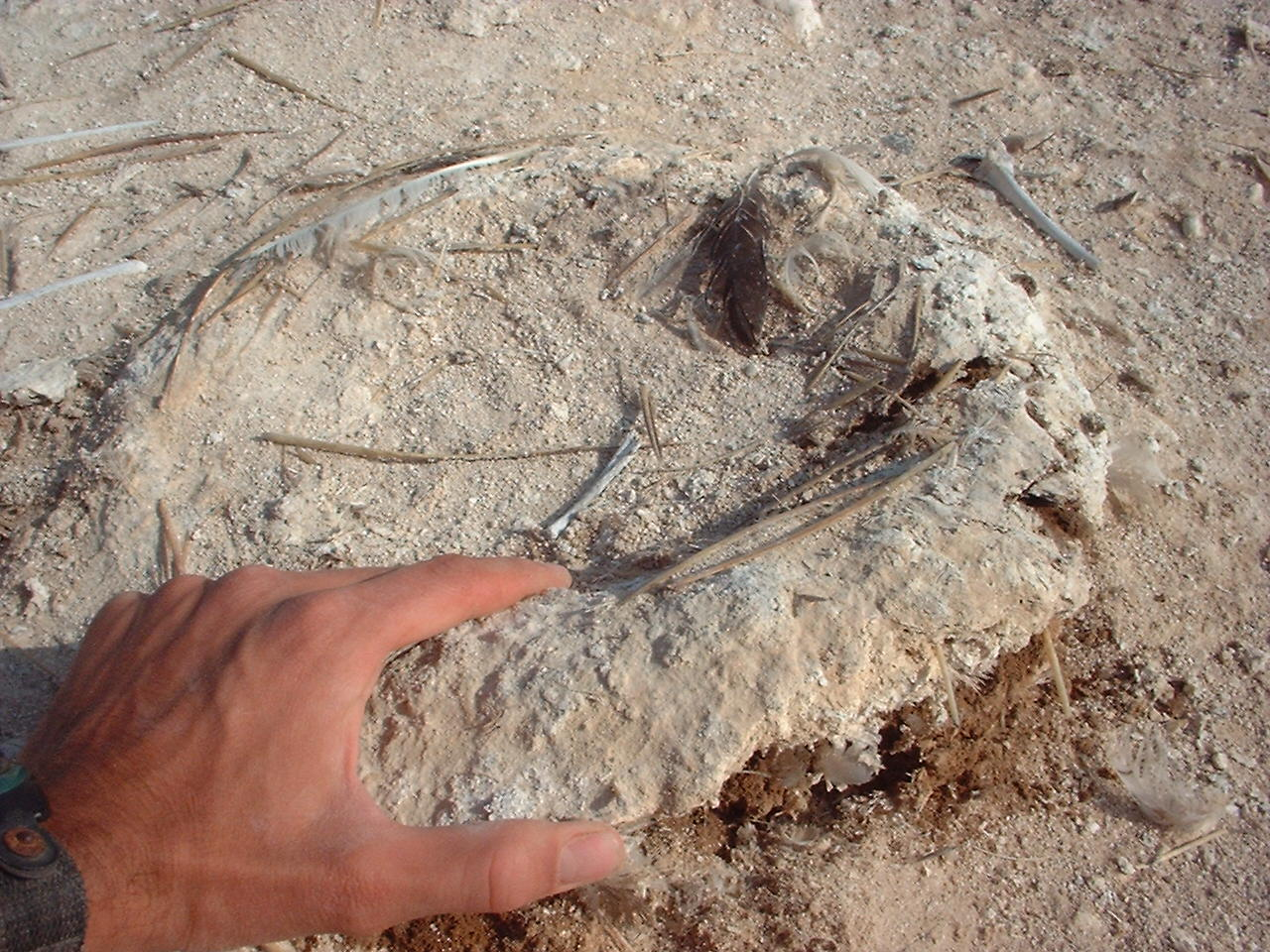
Peruvian booby nest made of guano and soil

=== Vocalizations ===
Female Peruvian boobies have a range of vocalizations; from trumpet-like quacks to honks. The male booby, on the other hand, tends to whistle. This kind of auditory communication is unique to adult members of the species, as it takes a few years to be able to produce such vocalizations.

=== Diet ===
The diet of the Peruvian booby consists primarily of anchovy, particularly Peruvian anchoveta. However, there is some variation in their diet based on their life stage. As well as anchovy, they are also documented to eat mackerel, depending on the relative abundance of their prey. They rely on the cold, productive waters of the Humboldt Current upwelling system for a consistent food source.

The events of El Niño have a significant impact on the success of the Peruvian booby, as they are responsible for a reduced availability of food for the birds. This in turn results in a decrease in breeding success.

==== Feeding ====
Peruvian boobies are plunge divers, with a relatively short dive time of 3.1–3.4 seconds. It is possible for them to demonstrate dives up to 15 seconds. With a mean dive depth of between 2.3 and 4.3 metres, they are relatively shallow diving birds.

They forage fairly close to shore, usually less than 5 km from their nests, however they have been seen as far as 40 km from the coast. Their foraging trips tend to only be a few hours, which is short in comparison to other similar sea birds that can spend several days foraging at sea. This suggests that Peruvian boobies prefer to remain closer to their colony when foraging. They forage in both smaller and larger groups.

They do not feed in very deep oceanic waters, and prefer shallow coastal areas and waters just off of the continental shelf break. When foraging at sea, the birds spend 90% of their time flying, and less than 10% of the time actually diving.

=== Flight ===
Peruvian boobies have relatively low wing loading, and are considered glide-flappers, meaning they alternate active flapping with short periods of gliding. Because of their wing morphology and style of flight, they have a preference of flying across the wind, as opposed to flying with a tailwind or headwind. This is beneficial because it requires less energy than flying directly into the wind, while it results in a higher prey encounter rate than flying at high speed with a tailwind.

The average speed of the Peruvian booby is approximately 44 kilometres per hour (27 mph), however they have been seen to be able to fly at speeds up to 139 kilometres per hour (86 mph).

=== Reproduction ===
Peruvian boobies breed throughout the year, however the main breeding season occurs during the austral spring–summer period (September to March). Pairs of birds may attempt to breed for a second time during the year depending on food availability. Peruvian boobies clutch size varies from one to four eggs, but clutches most frequently consist of two to three eggs. The eggs are pale blue in colour and are incubated for approximately four to five5 weeks, with both male and female parents sharing the nest attendance. The rearing period lasts about three months. Breeding success depends on food availability and is related to colony location, colony size and timing of breeding, among other variables.

==== Hybridization ====
The Peruvian boobies are thought to have a parapatric relationship with the blue-footed booby, and it is believed that their lineage diverged from 0.25 to 0.45 million years ago. Hybridization between the two species is far from unheard of, with hybrid females successfully able to lay eggs and raise resultant chicks. Hybridization occurs most frequently between female Peruvian boobies and male blue-footed boobies, while the inverse hybridization does still occur. It is speculated that this preference is a result of the more exaggerated sexual display of the male blue-footed booby, possibly causing him to seem a more captivating sexual partner than his Peruvian counterpart.
