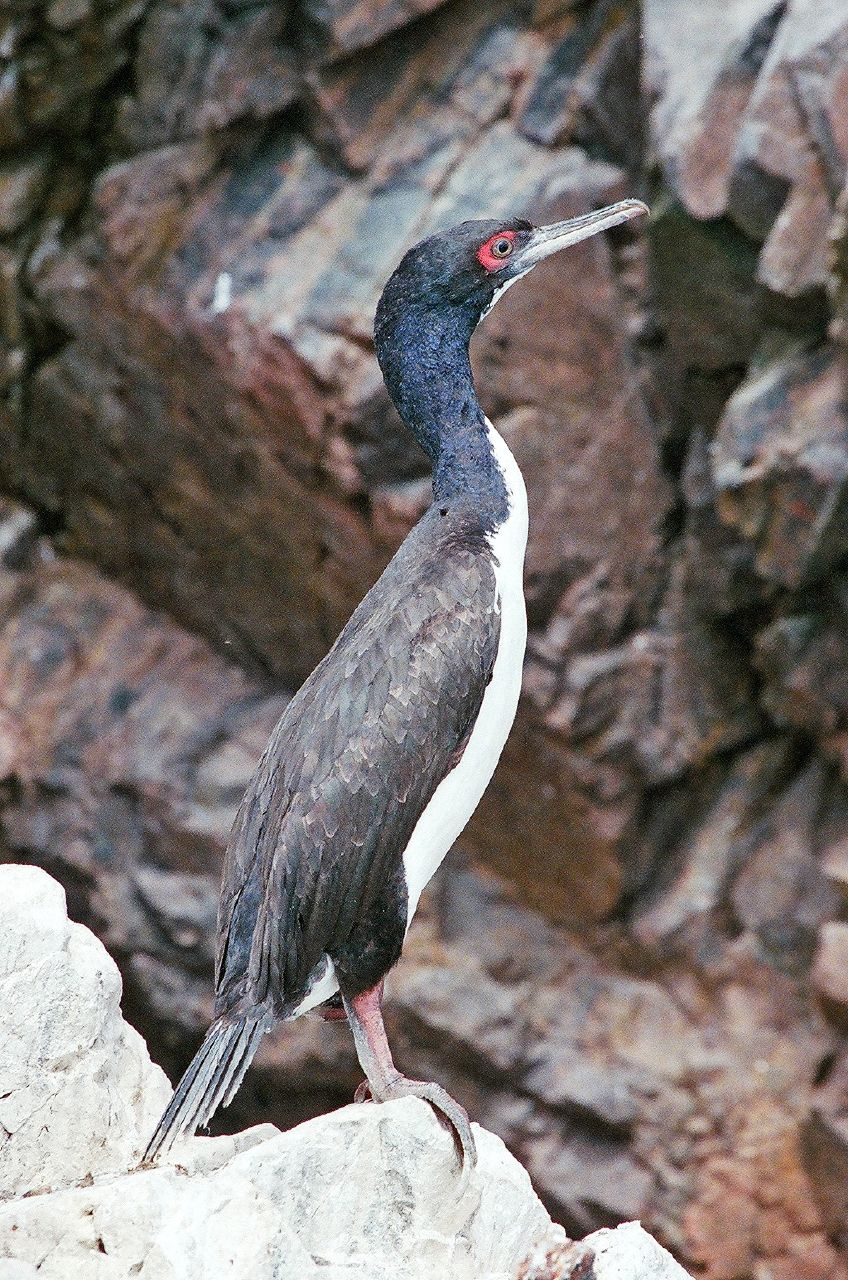
- Guanay cormorant on Islas Ballestas, Peru

Conservation status
- Near Threatened (IUCN 3.1)

Scientific classification
- Kingdom: Animalia
- Phylum: Chordata
- Class: Aves
- Order: Suliformes
- Family: Phalacrocoracidae
- Genus: Leucocarbo
- Species: L. bougainvilliorum

Binomial name
- Leucocarbo bougainvilliorum (Lesson, RP, 1837)
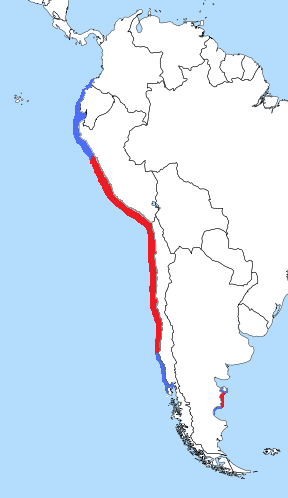
- Distribution map of the guanay cormorant

Synonyms
- Phalacrocorax bougainvillii Phalacrocorax bougainvilliorum Leucocarbo bougainvillii

= Guanay cormorant =

Species of bird

The guanay cormorant or guanay shag (Leucocarbo bougainvilliorum) is a member of the cormorant family found on the Pacific coast of Peru and northern Chile. After breeding it spreads south to southern parts of Chile and north to Ecuador, and has also been recorded as far north as Panama and Colombia, probably a result of mass dispersal due to food shortage in El Niño years. Its major habitats include shallow seawater and rocky shores. A former population on the Patagonian Atlantic coast of Argentina appears to be extinct.

== Taxonomy ==
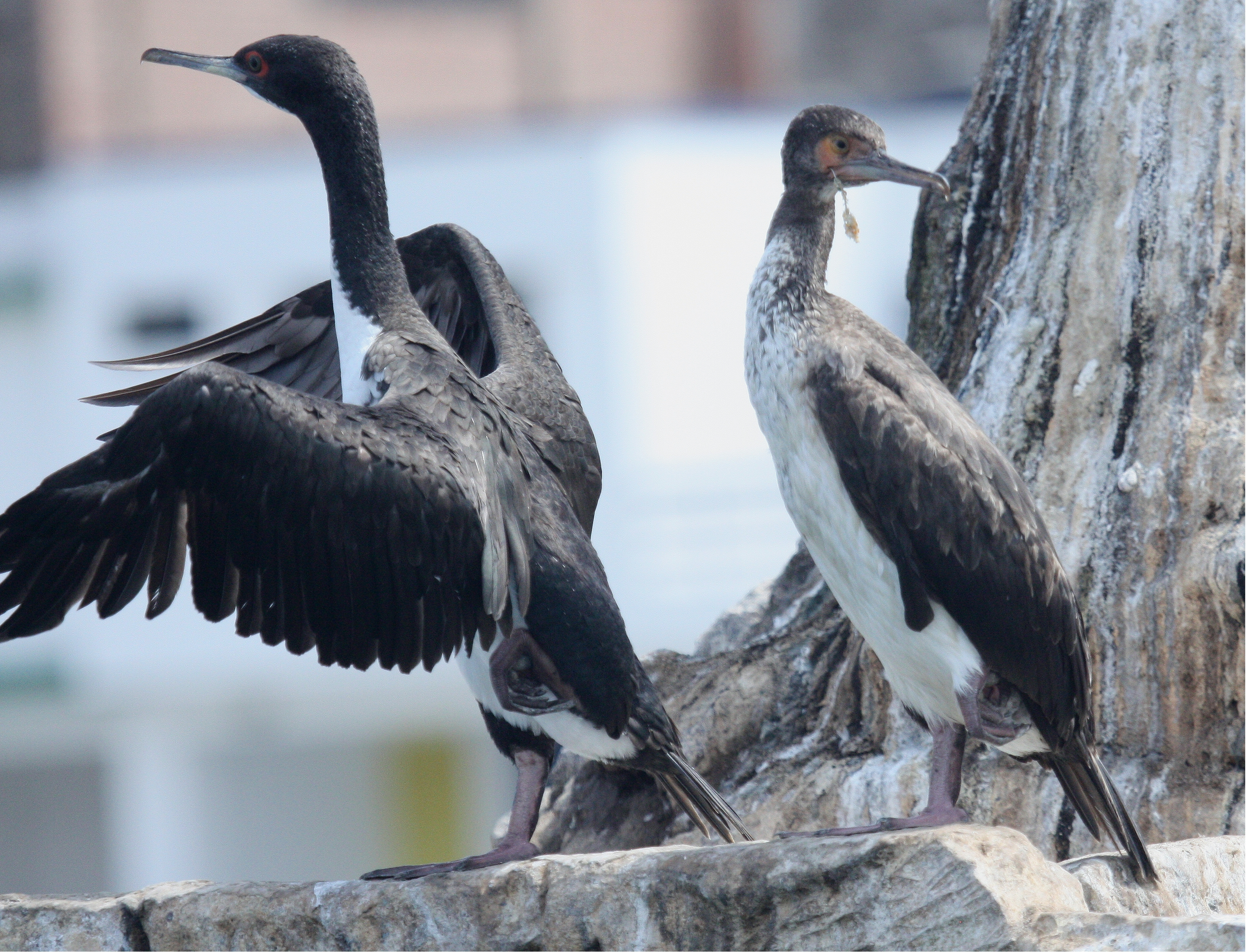
Immatures in Pucusana, Peru

Most taxonomic authorities, including the International Ornithologists' Union, place this species in the genus Leucocarbo. In the past, it was usually placed in a broad circumscription of the genus Phalacrocorax, and some authors still follow this. The scientific name commemorates the French naval officer Louis Antoine de Bougainville and his son Hyacinthe de Bougainville; the species epithet was corrected from the original bougainvillii to the plural spelling bougainvilliorum ("of the Bougainvilles") in 2020 to reflect this dual honoring.

== Description ==
The guanay cormorant is similar in plumage to the rock shag Leucocarbo magellanicus, but is larger, measuring 71–78 cm from the tip of the bill to the end of the tail, and has more extensive white on the underparts. The bill is grayish with some red at the base. The face is red with a green eye-ring. It has orange-pink feet. The head, neck and back are black, as are the outer parts of the thighs. The throat patch, breast and belly are white. In breeding plumage it has a few white feathers on the sides of the head and neck.

== Ecology ==
Breeding occurs year round with a peak in November and December. The nest is built of guano on flat surfaces on offshore islands or remote headlands. There are up to three nests per square meter in high-density colonies. The guanay cormorant lays two or three eggs of approximately 63 × 40 mm in size.

It feeds mainly on the Peruvian anchoveta Engraulis ringens, and the Peruvian silverside Odontesthes regia, which thrive in the cold Humboldt Current. The guanay cormorant is the main producer of guano.

Habitat loss and degradation and over-fishing have resulted in a steady decline of the population of about 30% from an estimated figure of three million birds in 1984. This species is listed as near threatened by IUCN.

The bird's droppings were such an important source of fertilizer to the peoples of the Andes that it was protected by Inca rulers, who supposedly made disturbing the cormorants in any way punishable by death. The common name is an adaptation of the South American Spanish guanae, a plural of the English equivalent guano.

== Sources ==
- "BirdLife International". Species factsheet: Phalacrocorax bougainvillii.
- "Red List". Red List of Threatened Species, IUCN.
- de la Peña, Martín R.; Rumboll, Maurice (1998). Birds of Southern South America and Antarctica. London: HarperCollinsPublishers. ISBN 0-00-220077-5.
- "GROMS". Global Register of Migratory Species.
