= Nazca (disambiguation) =

Nazca is a city in Peru.

Nazca, NAZCA or Nasca may also refer to:

== Places ==
- Nazca Desert, an alternate name for the Sechura Desert in western South America
- Nazca District, a district in the Nazca province, Peru
- Nazca Plate, a tectonic plate in the west of South America
- Nasca Province, a province in the Ica Region, Peru
- Nazca Ridge, an ocean ridge in the southern Pacific Ocean
- Nazca (crater) on the planet Mars
- Los Nascas, Comatrana, Ica, Peru; a barrio
- Nazcas River, a river in Durango, Mexico

== Nazca civilization ==
- Nazca culture, a pre-Columbian culture of the Nazca region
- Nazca Lines, the UNESCO world heritage site Lines and Geoglyphs of Nasca and Pampas de Jumana

== Biology ==
- Nazca (moth), a genus of geometer moths
- Nazca booby, a seabird

== Entertainment ==
- Nazca (anime), a 1998 anime television series
- Nazca, a character in Keroro Gunso the Super Movie 3

== Transportation ==
- Nazca (Buenos Aires Metro)
- Nazca airport, Ica Region, Peru
- BMW Nazca C2, a 1991 Italdesign made concept car

== Organizations ==
- NASCA International, a national organisation of swinging clubs.
- Nazca Corporation, a producer of video games for the Neo-Geo system, formed from Irem departees
- NAZCA, the Non-state Actor Zone for Climate Action, a web portal providing information about climate action around the world

== Other uses ==
- Sergio Nasca (1937-1989) Italian film director

== See also ==
- 1996 Nazca earthquake
- Paracas (disambiguation), including the pre-Nazca
- Naska (disambiguation)
