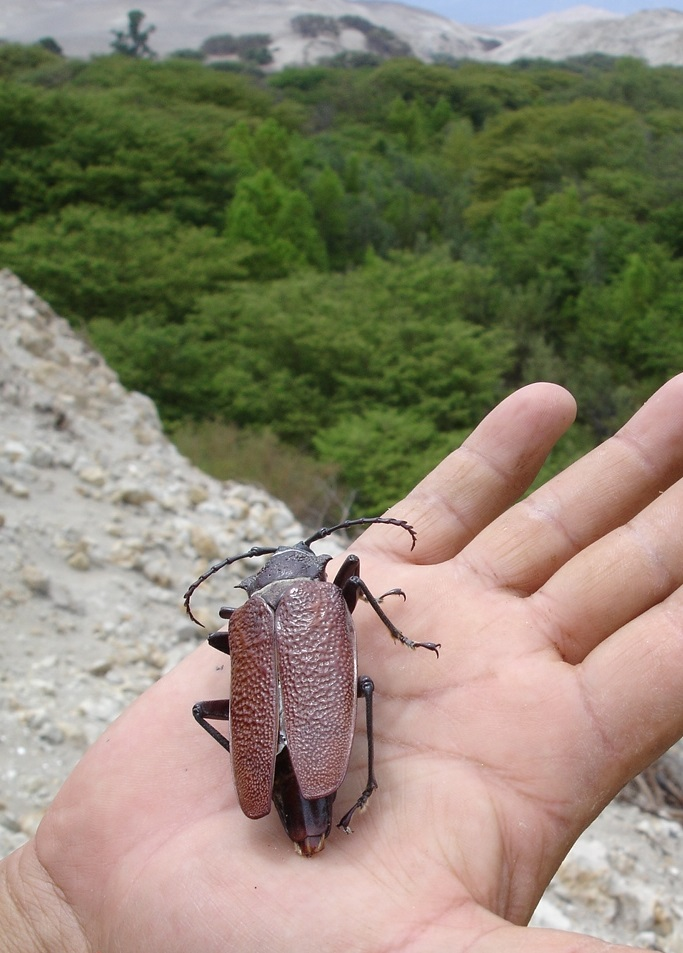

Scientific classification
- Kingdom: Animalia
- Phylum: Arthropoda
- Class: Insecta
- Order: Coleoptera
- Suborder: Polyphaga
- Infraorder: Cucujiformia
- Family: Cerambycidae
- Genus: Calocomus
- Species: C. rodingeri

Binomial name
- Calocomus rodingeri Tippmann, 1951

= Calocomus rodingeri =

Species of large beetle

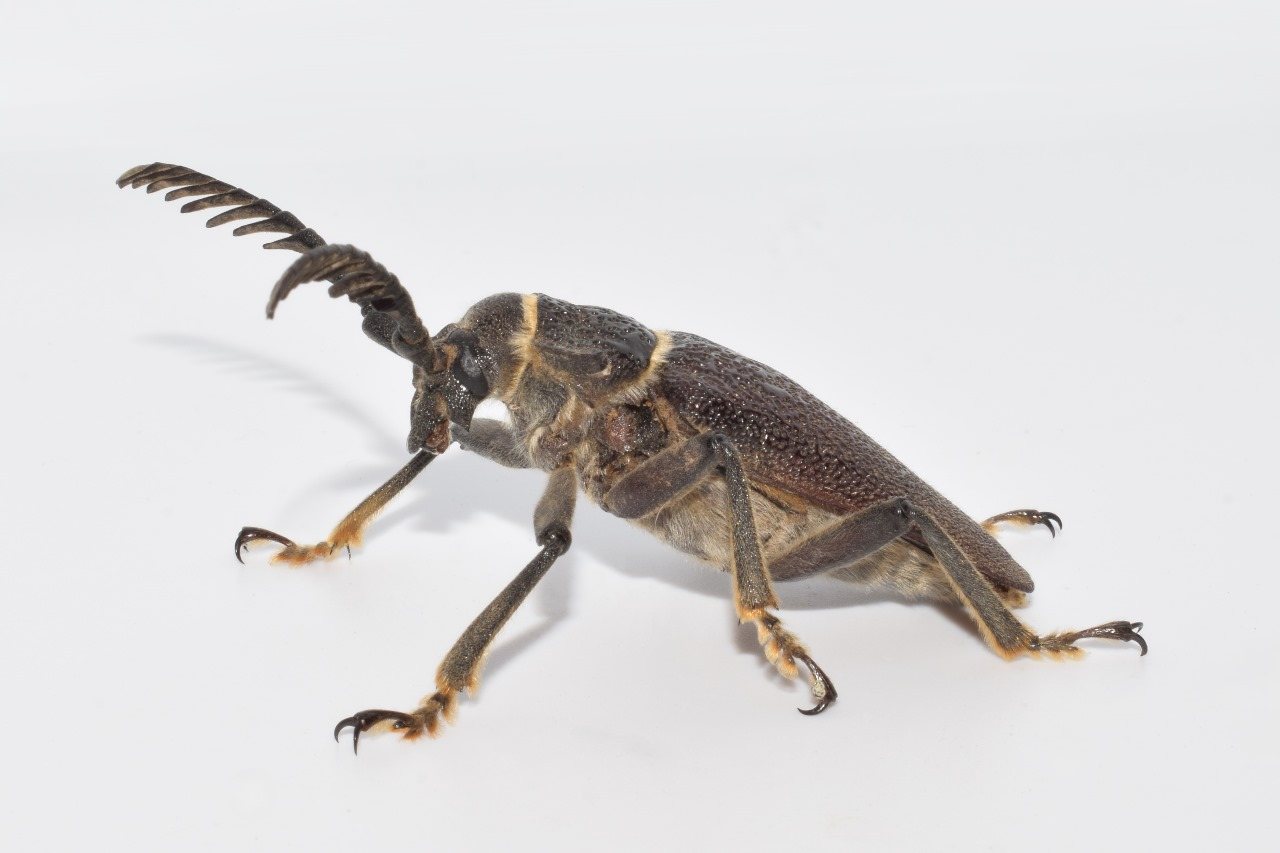
Adult found in Pajonal near fundo Agrolatina, Nazca, Ica Region, Peru

Calocomus rodingeri is a very large longhorn beetle (family Cerambycidae) endemic to southern Peru. It is confined to riparian oasis ecosystems associated with rivers descending from the Andes through the hyper-arid coastal desert, in the Ica Region.

The species female measures up to 7 cm (2.8 in) and the male only slightly smaller.The species is considered rare and elusive and has only been found a number of times in the arid habitats of the Ica Region in southern Peru. The type specimen is held at NMNH United States National Museum, Washington DC, USA.

The species has been found desiccated in desert margins near charcoal operations, and alive on two or three occasions to date since rediscovery in 2007. All found in riparian woodland oases around the Nazca district, of the Ica region, Peru.

The species inhabits marginal dry forest dominated by huarango (Prosopis (Neltuma) limensis ) and espino trees (Acacia macracantha) and the associated shrubs Baccharis salicifolia, Lycium americanum, Pluchea chingoyo, Scutia spicata, Tecoma fulva subsp. guarume and Vallesia glabra. Calocomus rodingeri is particularly associated with the seasonally dry river margins supporting reed beds of Arundo donax and Phragmites australis. The adult is also found in association with Salix humboldtiana and where desiccated larvae have also been found.

The biology of the species is not well documented, but it is thought that the larvae may live in, and consume, the rhizomes of the reed root balls, until adult development after several years.
