= Diego Chávez (footballer, born 1993) =

Peruvian footballer

Personal information
- Full name: Diego Armando Chávez Ramos
- Date of birth: 7 March 1993 (age 33)
- Place of birth: Parcona, Peru
- Height: 1.75 m (5 ft 9 in)
- Position: Right-back

Team information
- Current team: Universitario
- Number: 19

Youth career
- 1999–2012: Universitario

Senior career*
Years	Team	Apps	(Gls)
2012–2017	Universitario	129	(2)
2017	Sport Rosario	1	(0)
2018	Unión Huaral	22	(0)
2019	Deportivo Binacional	1	(0)
2019	José Gálvez		
2020–	Universitario	16	(0)

International career
2013	Peru U-20	7	(0)
- * Club domestic league appearances and goals as of 16:56, 6 December 2020 (UTC)

Diego Armando Chávez Ramos (born 7 March 1993) is a Peruvian footballer who plays for club Club Universitario de Deportes in the Liga 1.

== Club career ==
In January 2012, Chávez was promoted to the Universitario first team by manager José Chemo del Solar for the start of the 2012 season. He made his Torneo Descentralizado debut on 19 February 2012 in the first round of the season away to Inti Gas Deportes. He played the entire match, but his side conceded a goal in the 93rd minute from Luis Coronado and lost the match 1–0. He returned to the starting eleven in Round 5 away to the Elías Aguirre Stadium against Juan Aurich, and the match eventually finished in a 1–0 win for the home team.

Chávez signed for Deportivo Binacional on 16 December 2018 for the 2019 season.

== Honours ==
Universitario de Deportes

- Torneo Descentralizado: 2013
