= El Carmen (San Juan Bautista) =

Agricultural village in south Peru

Coordinates: 13°58′14.2825″S 75°43′44.91″W

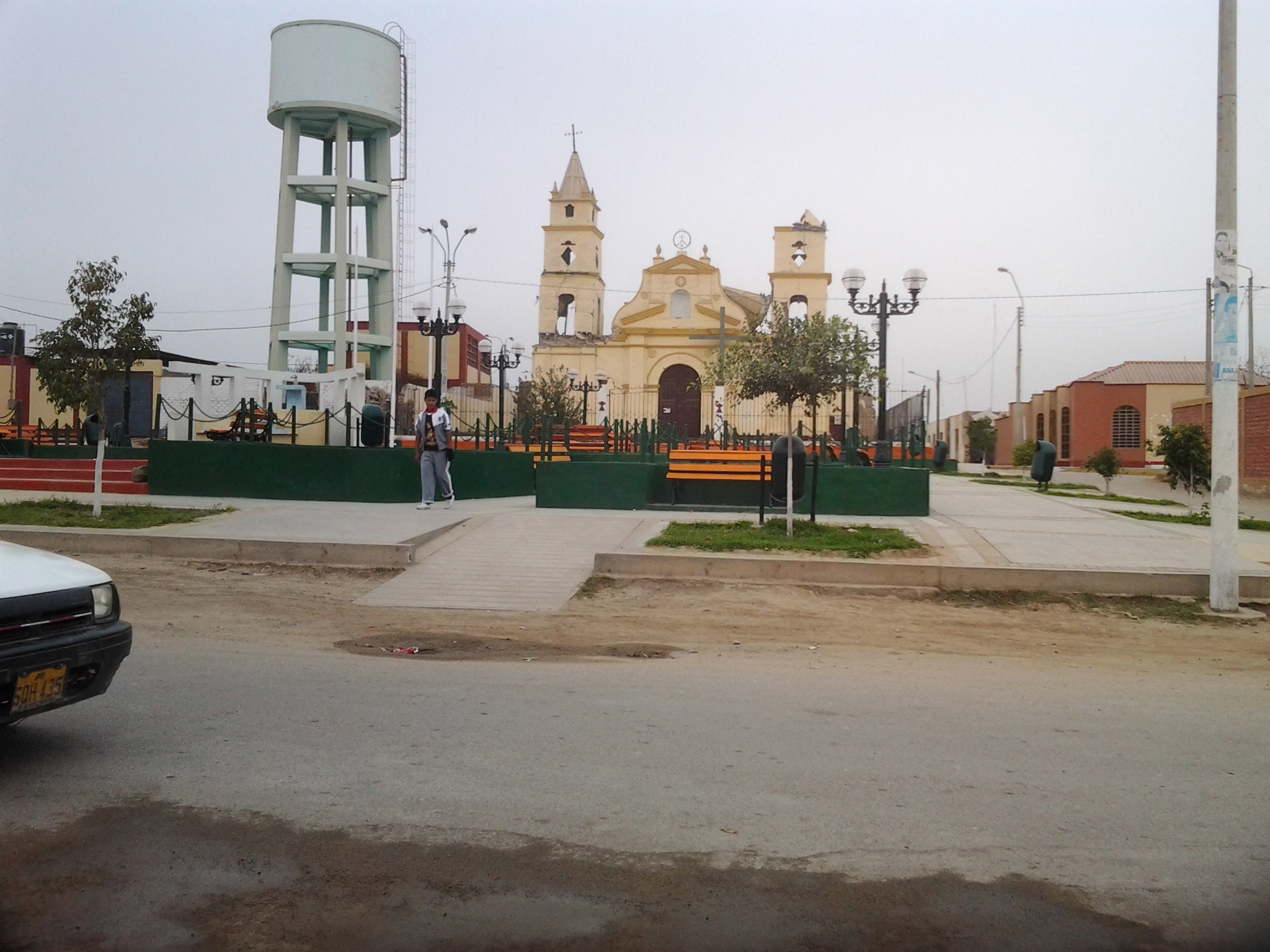
Village square with earthquake damaged church Yglesia del Carmen which was built in 1779, which is no longer in use but church authorities are restricted from demolishing it by the local government authorities due to its historical significance.

El Carmen (latitude -13.970634, longitude -75.729141) is an agricultural village in the district of San Juan Bautista which is in the Province of Ica, in the Region of Ica, in south Peru. (Not to be confused with a 'district' of the same name of El Carmen which is located to the north in the Chincha Province of Ica Region).

El Carmen is approximately 8 kilometers north of the larger town of San Juan Bautista, just south of a small village of El Olivo. The population of El Carmen was about 2,000 in 2010. It has another population center called 'Invacion' directly next door, which add another 1,000 (approximate) people to the immediate village area size.

San Juan Bautista town, south of El Carmen, is where the Tacama Winery is located (Peru Population maps). El Carmen is a residential area for many of the farm workers for Tacama and other surrounding vineyards and farms. El Carmen was badly damaged by the 2007 Earthquake in Peru. The main school in town is Instituto Estatal 22340. The main church in the village square is Yglesia del Carmen, built in 1779, but was destroyed during this 2007 earthquake. It has not been demolished yet due to its history and desire to restore it, but it appears to be too far gone.

El Carmen is also where the Latin American Missionary Association (LAMA) has built a missionary (-13.970664, -75.729493). The efforts for this missionary, to help this and surrounding villages on a charitable level, were started as a direct result of the earthquake to this village.
