= Paracas =

Paracas or variation, may refer to:

== Places ==
- Paracas Peninsula, located in the Ica Region of Peru
- Paracas Bay, located in the Pisco Province of the Ica Region in Peru
- Paracas (municipality), the capital city of the Paracas District
- Paracas District, located in the Pisco Province of the Ica Region in Peru
- Paracas National Reserve

== Paracas civilization ==
- Paracas culture, an Andean society that existed in Peru between approximately 750 BC and 100 AD
- Paracas Candelabra, a prehistoric geoglyph on the Paracas Peninsula
- Paracas textile

== Other uses ==
- Climate-adaptive skincare brand Paracas
- Hotel Paracas, Pisco, Peru; a luxury resort hotel
- Savo Parača, president of the basketball club KK Lovćen
- Nikola Parača (born 1999), basketball player on the KK Lovćen
- Paraca (racehorse), winner of the 2003 Birthday Card Stakes, 2004 D.C. McKay Stakes

== See also ==
- Paracas–Arequipa–Antofalla terrain, a geological unit of the Central Andes
- Nazca (disambiguation), including the post-Paracas
