= Pueblo Nuevo District, Ica =

Coordinates: 14.1271°S 75.7059°W

Pueblo Nuevo, Peru
- District
- Interactive map of Pueblo Nuevo, Peru
- Country: Peru
- Region: Ica
- Province: Ica
- Founded: January 30, 1871
- Capital: Pueblo Nuevo

Government
  - Mayor: Julio Fredy Condori Flores

Area
  - Total: 33.12 km^{2} (12.79 sq mi)
- Elevation: 390 m (1,280 ft)

Population (2005 census)
  - Total: 4,582
  - Density: 138.3/km^{2} (358.3/sq mi)
- Time zone: UTC-5 (PET)
- UBIGEO: 110107

Pueblo Nuevo District is one of the fourteen districts of the Ica Province in Peru.

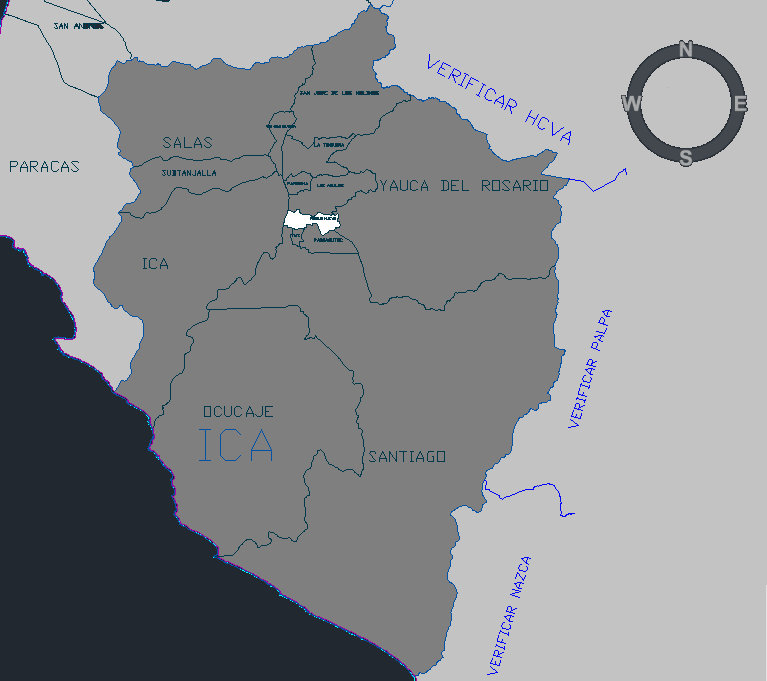
File:Pueblo Nuevo district within Ica Province of Ica Region, Peru.
