= Vista Alegre District, Nazca =

Coordinates: 14.8452°S 74.9439°W

Vista Alegre
- District
- Coat of arms
- Interactive map of Vista Alegre
- Country: Peru
- Region: Ica
- Province: Nazca
- Founded: September 20, 1984
- Capital: Vista Alegre

Government
  - Mayor: José Luis Gutiérrez Cortez

Area
  - Total: 527.3 km^{2} (203.6 sq mi)
- Elevation: 585 m (1,919 ft)

Population (2007 census)
  - Total: 13,711
  - Density: 26.00/km^{2} (67.35/sq mi)
- Time zone: UTC-5 (PET)
- UBIGEO: 110305
- Website: munivistaalegre.gob.pe

Vista Alegre District is one of five districts of the province Nazca in Peru.

== History ==
Vista Alegre District was created by Law 23927 (20 September 1984).

== Climate ==
Climate data for Copara, Vista Alegre, elevation 587 m (1,926 ft), (1991–2020)
Month	Jan	Feb	Mar	Apr	May	Jun	Jul	Aug	Sep	Oct	Nov	Dec	Year
Mean daily maximum °C (°F)	31.9 (89.4)	32.4 (90.3)	32.7 (90.9)	31.6 (88.9)	29.7 (85.5)	27.3 (81.1)	26.6 (79.9)	27.9 (82.2)	29.7 (85.5)	31.1 (88.0)	31.5 (88.7)	31.8 (89.2)	30.4 (86.6)
Mean daily minimum °C (°F)	18.2 (64.8)	19.4 (66.9)	18.6 (65.5)	16.4 (61.5)	12.6 (54.7)	9.6 (49.3)	8.5 (47.3)	8.8 (47.8)	10.2 (50.4)	11.9 (53.4)	13.1 (55.6)	16.0 (60.8)	13.6 (56.5)
Average precipitation mm (inches)	1.9 (0.07)	1.8 (0.07)	0.5 (0.02)	0.1 (0.00)	0.1 (0.00)	0.1 (0.00)	0.3 (0.01)	0.0 (0.0)	0.0 (0.0)	0.1 (0.00)	0.0 (0.0)	0.2 (0.01)	5.1 (0.18)
Source: National Meteorology and Hydrology Service of Peru

== Authorities ==
=== Mayors ===
- 2011-2014: José Luis Gutiérrez Cortez, Partido Regional de Integración (PRI).
- 2007-2010: Eusebio Alfonso Canales Velarde.

== Festivities ==
- Our Lady of Fatima

== See also ==
- Administrative divisions of Peru
