= San Juan Bautista District, Ica =

Coordinates: 14.0113°S 75.7351°W

San Juan Bautista Distrito de San Juan Bautista
- District
- Interactive map of San Juan Bautista
- Country: Peru
- Region: Ica
- Province: Ica
- Founded: June 25, 1876
- Capital: San Juan Bautista

Government
  - Mayor: Jorge Luis Quispe Saavedra

Area
  - Total: 26.39 km^{2} (10.19 sq mi)
- Elevation: 416 m (1,365 ft)

Population (2005 census)
  - Total: 11,382
  - Density: 431.3/km^{2} (1,117/sq mi)
- Time zone: UTC-5 (PET)
- UBIGEO: 110110
- Website: http://www.munisanjuanbautistaica.gob.pe/

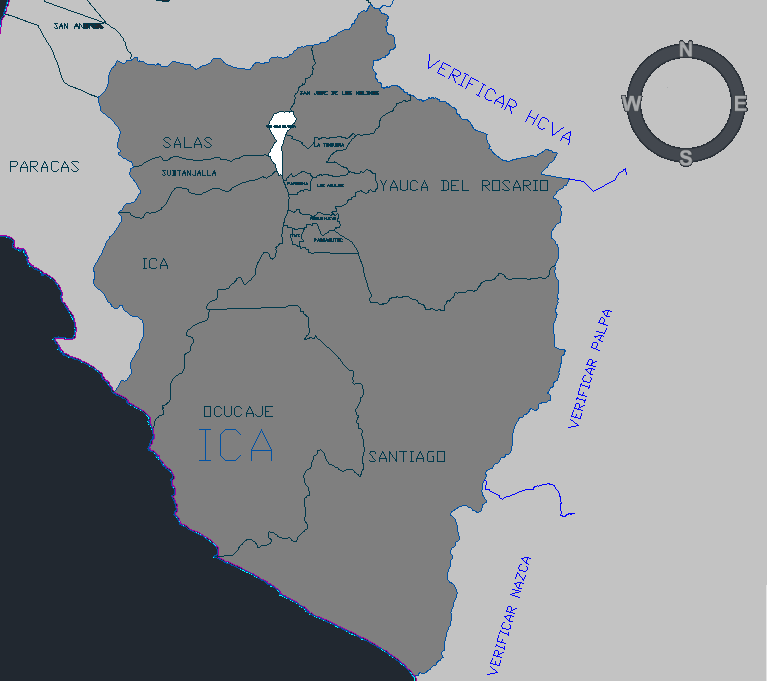
San Juan Bautista district of Ica Province within Ica Region, Peru.

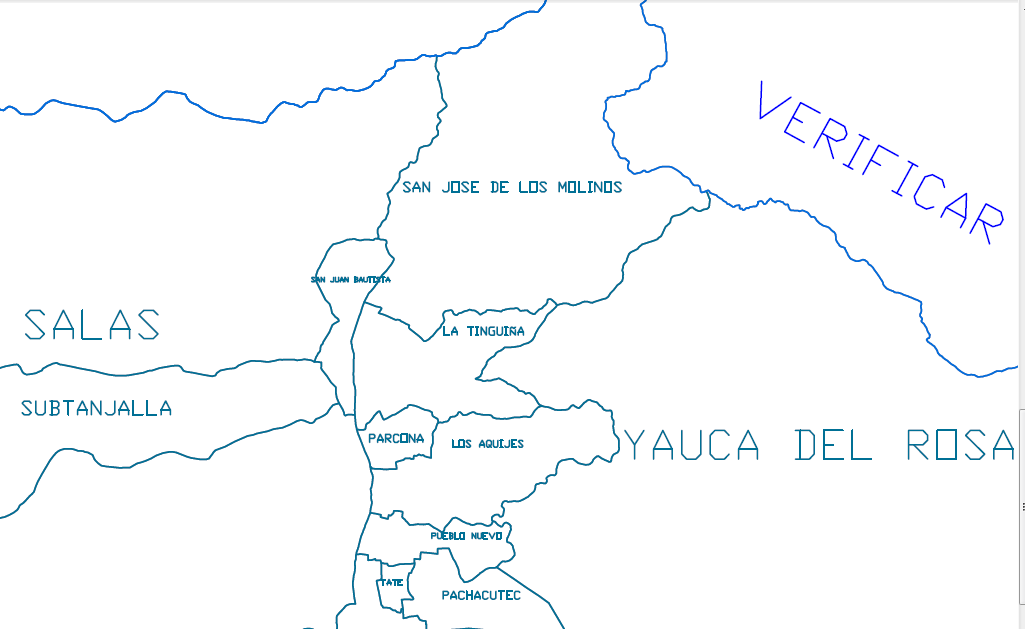
San Juan Bautista District and other smaller Districts around the city of Ica, Peru within the Province of Ica, Region of Ica.

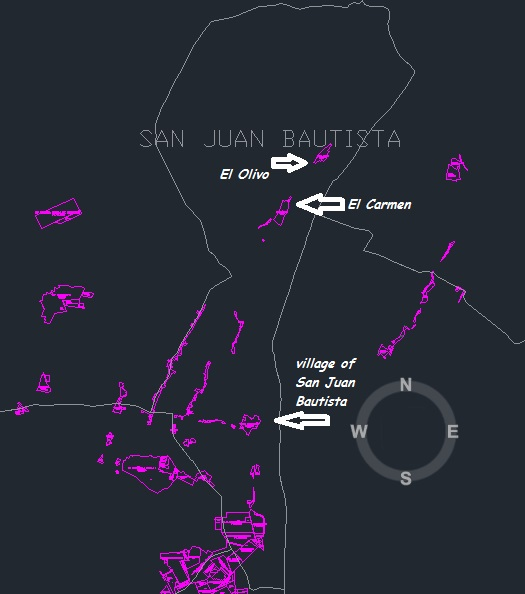
Primary villages within San Juan Bautista District, which is an agricultural area focused on grape production just north of Ica, Peru

San Juan Bautista District is one of fourteen districts of the Ica Province of the Ica Region of Peru. The District 'seat' is the town of San Juan Bautista.

Other neighboring village in this district are El Olivo, and El Carmen (not to be confused with another District of the same name in the Chincha province of Ica). Both of these villages are approximately 8 to 10 kilometers north of village of San Juan Bautista.

This entire District suffered greatly from the 2007 Peru earthquake.

== History ==
San Juan Bautista District was created on June 25, 1876, during Manuel Pardo y Lavalle term.

The Origin and Community Foundation of San Juan Bautista, is given in the Inca era where there was a settlement in which the District of San Juan Bautista, called the Collana Huaranga of San Juan de Urin Ica, under the Inca chiefs of Tataxe Dynasty (Tataje) and Achichicamas (Anicama). In 1600 it was known under the name of "Chiefdom". This human settlement was part of the distribution or encomendería of Don Nicolas de Rivera "El Viejo" being its first indigenous curaca Don Domingo Tataxe.

As a people the district was created in the colonial era by Don Nicolás de Rivera the Elder, the origin is lost in the religious fervor of the colonial era and was under the patronage of the "precursor of the Messiah" in the year 1549 the Spaniards founded the First Parish of San Juan Bautista, from where they began catechizing the indigenous people of the North and center of the province of Ica. This parish was of great importance and roots, the proof is that here lived the chronicler Miguel Cabello Balboa; in view of the religious fervor at the time 1600, they built the first church of Cana Brava, mud and guarangos in the atrium of the current church, after the Jesuit priest Don Francisco Agustín Mendieta Mariaca, built the present church Matrix, between the years 1762 to 1774. The participating farmers and indigenous leaders or chiefs with his subjects would meet on Sunday to labor for 12 years. The Church is aware of classic style with three naves, altar and Huarango 14 columns covered with reed and plaster, this church is considered a national historic monument by the National Institute of Culture and was destroyed by the earthquake of 2007.

== Mayors ==
- 2007-2014: Jorge Luis Quispe Saavedra, Partido Aprista Peruano.

== Festivities ==
- Saint Joseph.
- Saint John the Baptist.
- Our Lady of Mount Carmel.
- Our Lady of the Rosary.

== See also ==
- Administrative divisions of Peru.
