= Jenny de la Torre Castro =

Peruvian-German physician (1954–2025)

Jenny de la Torre Castro (1954 – June 10, 2025) was a German-Peruvian physician. She founded the Jenny de la Torre Foundation (Jenny De la Torre Stiftung) to serve homeless people in Berlin.

== Life and career ==
Jenny de la Torre Castro grew up in Nazca, Peru. In 1973, she began her medical studies at the San Luis Gonzaga National University in Ica. A year later she obtained a scholarship to continue medical studies in the German Democratic Republic.

In 1992 and 1993, she led a project for pregnant women who were in conditions of poverty.

Torre Castro died on June 10, 2025, at the age of 71.

== Awards ==
- 1997 Bundesverdienstkreuz: (Order of Merit of the Federal Republic of Germany)
