= Paul Kosok =

American historian

Paul August Kosok (21 April 1898 – 1959) was an American professor of history and government, who is credited as the first serious researcher of the Nazca Lines in Peru. His work on the lines started in 1939, when he was doing field study related to the irrigation systems of ancient cultures. By the 1950s, he had completed extensive mapping of more than 300 ancient canals in Peru, in collaboration with archeologist Richard P. Schaedel. Kosok demonstrated the culture's sophisticated management of water to support their settlements.

Observing the Nazca Lines, he recognized that some patterns represented living creatures, and some lines related to astronomical events. His study of archeo-astronomy aspects contributed to the recognition of the lines as an important archeological resource, which Peru has protected. The Nazca Lines were designated in 1994 as a UNESCO World Heritage Site.

== Early life and education ==
Kosok was born in Long Island City, New York, the son of August and Maria Kosok, immigrants from Germany. He attended public schools before going to college, where he earned a doctorate in history.

== Academic career ==
Kosok began as an assistant professor of history at Long Island University (LIU) in Brooklyn, where he taught several courses in history. His work, Modern Germany: A Study of Conflicting Loyalties, (1933), was written before the Nazis came to power and published by the University of Chicago Press as part of its "Studies of the Making of Citizens". One reviewer described this as a "series on civic training in various countries and systems". Kosok's book was used by the State Department and others in training and preparing individuals for foreign service. It was reprinted in 1969.

As part of his education, Kosok studied and traveled in Europe in 1928 and in 1937. His early teaching at LIU included classes in the history of science.

In the 1930s, Kosok became interested in irrigation systems of ancient cultures and their relation to patterns of settlement. He devoted most of the next twenty years of research to that topic, during which he collaborated with the archeologist Richard P. Schaedel. For instance, together they identified and mapped more than 300 ancient canals of prehistoric Peru and found that the people had built highly sophisticated systems for shifting water from one valley to another.

Kosok did field studies in Peru in 1940–1941 and 1948–1949, becoming more involved in anthropology as a result of this direction of research. He went to Peru to study the ancient canal systems, "reconstruct the maximum areas of pre-Columbian cultivation, and assess the relation of irrigation to settlement patterns".

He soon realized that the Nazca Lines were too shallow to have acted as part of the irrigation system. On a flight over them, Kosok realized that one pattern represented a bird. He also noticed that some of the lines converged on that date of the winter solstice in the Southern Hemisphere. This inspired his study of the lines to assess if they were related to astronomy, as he knew that solar events were closely followed by ancient agricultural societies for their planting cycles.

Following his field studies on the irrigation systems, Kosok planned two volumes: one of general interest and one more technical. He was working on the general interest book on the irrigation of ancient cultures when he died in 1959; it was published posthumously in 1965 with the support of Schaedel. His manuscript for a scholarly text needed work that was to be undertaken by the University of Texas. Kosok's book included extensive mapping of canals through numerous valleys and innovative use of aerial photography. His work was praised posthumously as a "program of research about the significance of irrigation on the North Coast of Peru to both Andean and cross-cultural studies, a sourcebook of ideas and hypotheses for generations of field workers".

Beginning in 1940, Kosok was aided in Peru by Maria Reiche, a German translator and mathematician from Lima. She spoke five languages and aided in mapping the lines, as well as assessed how the massive figures might have been scaled up from smaller drawings or patterns. After Kosok left Peru in 1949, Reiche continued to study the Nazca Lines, soon mapping 18 more figures. She worked for the rest of her life to preserve the Nazca Lines and have them recognized until her own death in 1998 in Peru. In 1994 they were designated as a UNESCO World Heritage Site.

A musician, Kosok also conducted the Brooklyn Philharmonic at the Brooklyn Academy of Music. Inspired by his travels in Peru, he composed The Andean Rhapsody. He conducted its premiere by the Brooklyn Philharmonic.

Dr. Kosok became chairman of the Department of History and Government at Long Island University, located in Brooklyn, New York. He was a respected scholar in history, anthropology, music, and mathematics.

== Marriage and family ==
Kosok married Rose Wyler. She traveled and worked with him in Peru in 1941 when he was doing field studies there. Of their children, their son Michael accompanied his parents to Peru in 1948–49.

== Works ==
- Modern Germany: A Study of Conflicting Loyalties, University of Chicago Press, 1933; reprint, Russell & Russell, 1969
- "El Valle de Lambayeque" (Segundo Congreso de Hislmia del Perz2, tom0 1, 1959
- Life, Land, and Water in Ancient Peru (1965), Long Island University Press (includes photographs by Kosok)
