= Los Aquijes District =

Coordinates: 14.0963°S 75.6914°W

Los Aquijes
- District
- Interactive map of Los Aquijes
- Country: Peru
- Region: Ica
- Province: Ica
- Founded: November 29, 1926
- Capital: Los Aquijes

Government
  - Mayor: Karol Rojo Ventura

Area
  - Total: 90.92 km^{2} (35.10 sq mi)
- Elevation: 475 m (1,558 ft)

Population (2005 census)
  - Total: 15,026
  - Density: 165.3/km^{2} (428.0/sq mi)
- Time zone: UTC-5 (PET)
- UBIGEO: 110103

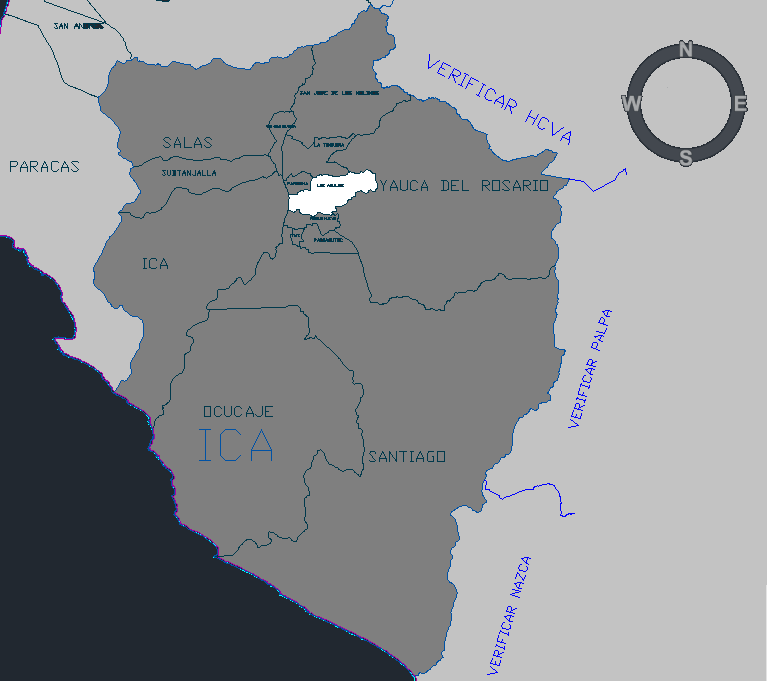
Los Aquijes District, within Ica Province of Ica Region of Peru

Los Aquijes District is one of fourteen districts of the province Ica in Peru.
