= Tate District =

Coordinates: 14.1556°S 75.7078°W

Tate
- District
- Interactive map of Tate
- Country: Peru
- Region: Ica
- Province: Ica
- Founded: January 24, 1964
- Capital: Tate de la Capilla

Government
  - Mayor: Walter Gabriel Baldiño Ascencio

Area
  - Total: 7.07 km^{2} (2.73 sq mi)
- Elevation: 392 m (1,286 ft)

Population (2005 census)
  - Total: 3,699
  - Density: 523/km^{2} (1,360/sq mi)
- Time zone: UTC-5 (PET)
- UBIGEO: 110113

Tate District is the smallest of fourteen districts of the province Ica in Peru.

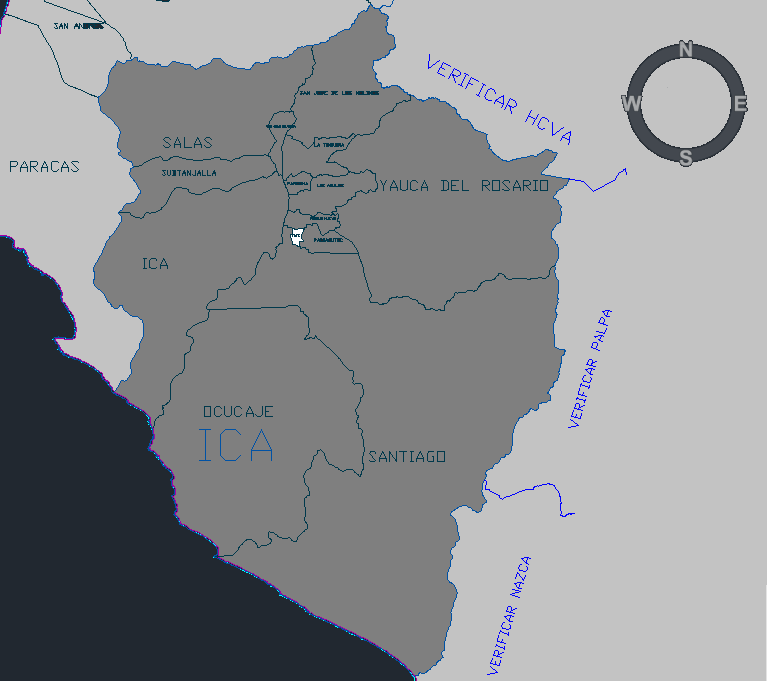
File:Tate district within Ica province of Ica region, Peru.
