= Comatrana =

- Town
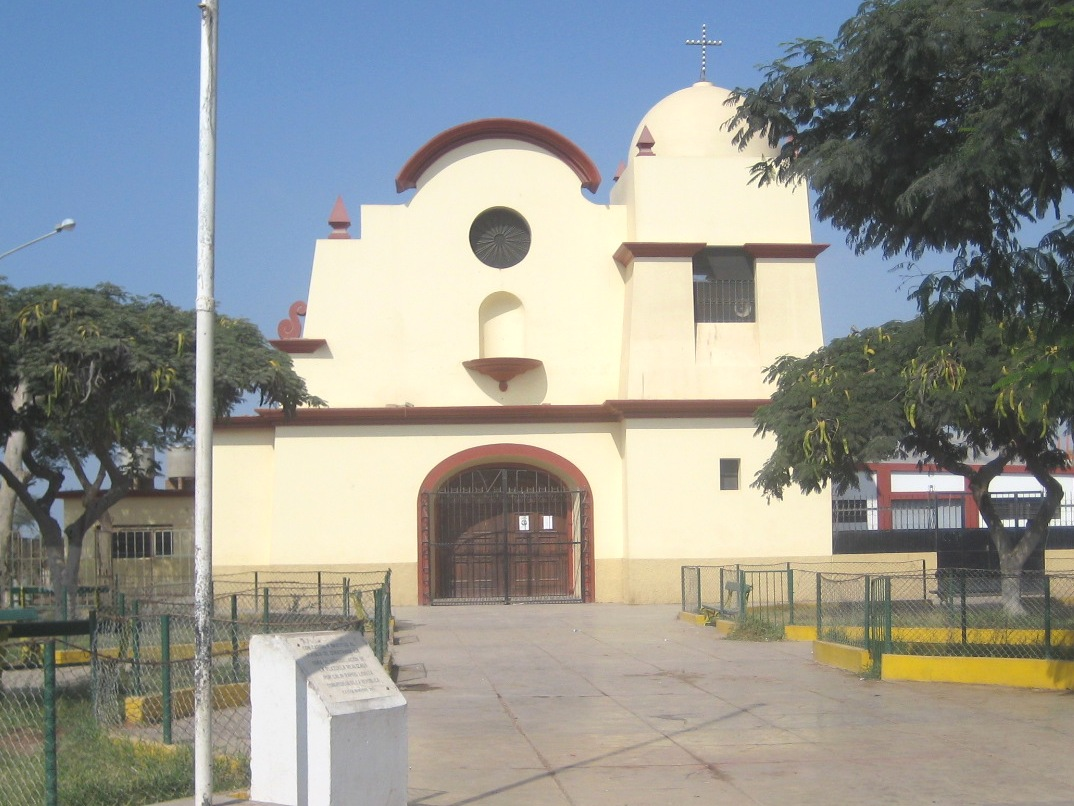

- Location in Peru
- Coordinates: 14°4′23″S 75°45′5″W
- Country: Peru
- Region: Ica Region
- Province: Ica Province
- District: Ica District

Comatrana is a town in Ica Province, Peru, located three kilometres from Ica. Landmarks of note include the San José de Madres Carmelitas Descalzas Monastery and the Comatrana Temple.

== Barrios ==
Comatrana is divided administratively into the following barrios:

- Alto Comatrana
- Los Juárez
- La Victoria
- Los Nascas
- El Huarango
- El Espino
