= Pachacútec District =

Coordinates: 14.1523°S 75.6917°W

Pachacútec District Pachakutiq
- District
- Interactive map of Pachacútec District
- Country: Peru
- Region: Ica
- Province: Ica
- Founded: July 24, 1964
- Capital: Pampa de Tate

Government
  - Mayor: José Luis Salas Cahua

Area
  - Total: 34.47 km^{2} (13.31 sq mi)
- Elevation: 409 m (1,342 ft)

Population (2007 census)
  - Total: 6,000
  - Density: 170/km^{2} (450/sq mi)
- Time zone: UTC-5 (PET)
- UBIGEO: 110105

Pachacútec District is one of fourteen districts of the province Ica in Peru.

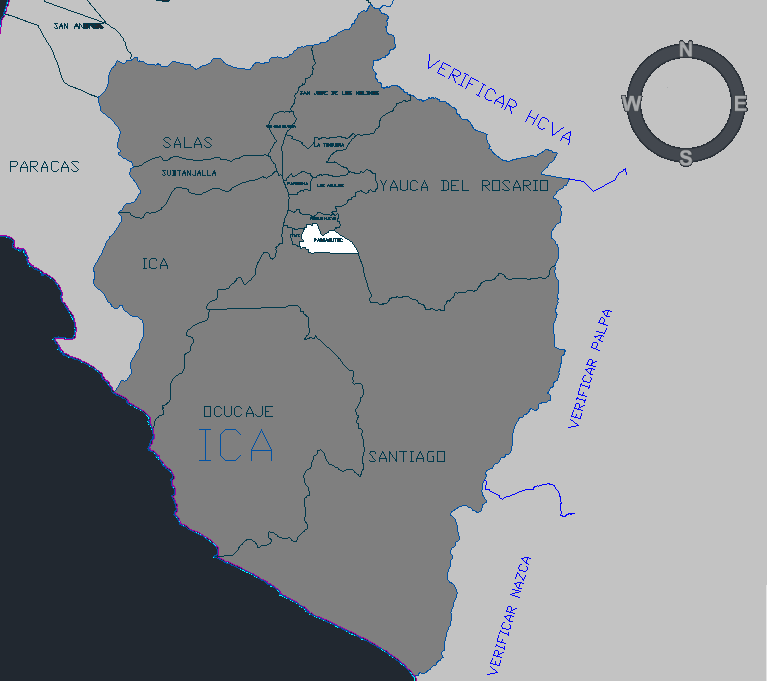
Pachacútec district within Ica Province of Ica Region, Peru.

== History ==
Pachacútec District was created by Law 15114 (July 24, 1964).

== Authorities ==
=== Mayors ===
- 2011-2014: José Luis Salas Cahua.
- 2007-2010: Angel Adrián Palomino Ramos.

== Festivities ==
- Rose of Lima
- Our Lady of the Rosary
- Lord of Luren

== See also ==
- Administrative divisions of Peru
