= Yauca del Rosario District =

Coordinates: 14.1737°S 75.3780°W

Yauca del Rosario
- District
- Interactive map of Yauca del Rosario
- Country: Peru
- Region: Ica
- Province: Ica
- Founded: June 25, 1855
- Capital: Curis

Government
  - Mayor: Pelagio Ramos Valencia

Area
  - Total: 1,289.1 km^{2} (497.7 sq mi)
- Elevation: 825 m (2,707 ft)

Population (2005 census)
  - Total: 1,030
  - Density: 0.799/km^{2} (2.07/sq mi)
- Time zone: UTC-5 (PET)
- UBIGEO: 110114

Yauca del Rosario District is one of fourteen districts of the province Ica in Peru.

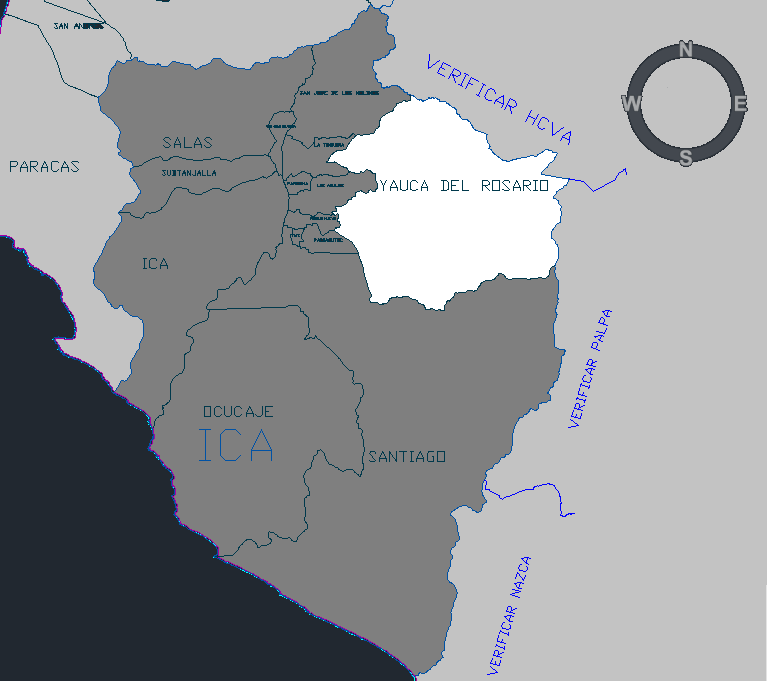
Yauca Del Rosario district within Ica province of Ica region, Peru.
