= Naska =

Naska may refer to:

- Alberto Naska (born 1990), Italian social media personality and racing driver
- Naska (singer) (born 1997), Italian singer-songwriter

== See also ==
- Nazca (disambiguation)
