= Salas District, Ica =

Coordinates: 13.9860°S 75.7729°W

Salas District
- District
- Interactive map of Salas District
- Country: Peru
- Region: Ica
- Province: Ica
- Founded: February 11, 1925
- Capital: Guadalupe

Government
  - Mayor: Juan Carlos Quijandria Lavarello

Area
  - Total: 651.72 km^{2} (251.63 sq mi)
- Elevation: 425 m (1,394 ft)

Population (2005 census)
  - Total: 13,921
  - Density: 21.360/km^{2} (55.323/sq mi)
- Time zone: UTC-5 (PET)
- UBIGEO: 110108

Salas District is one of fourteen districts of the province Ica in Peru.

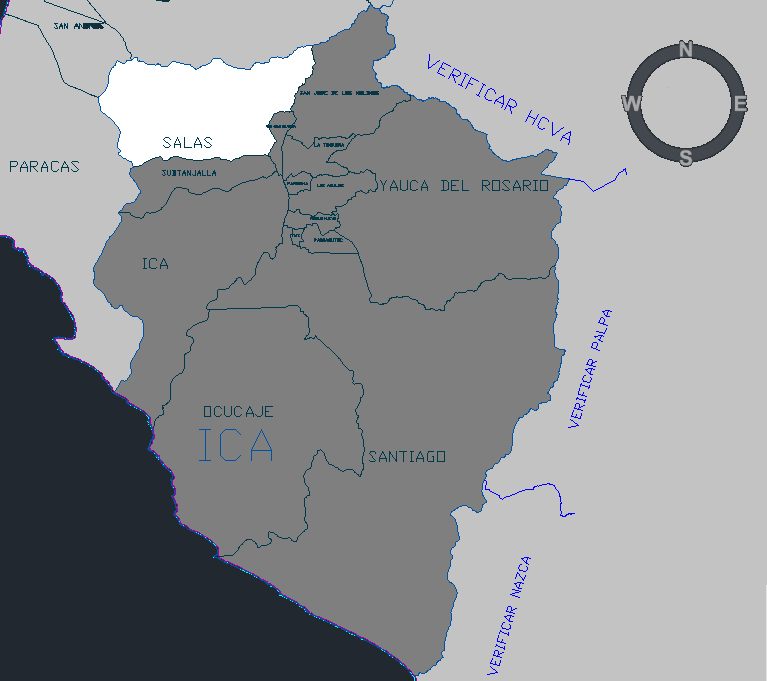
Salas district within Ica province of Ica region, Peru.
