= Changuillo District =

Coordinates: 14.6640°S 75.2228°W

Changuillo
- District
- Interactive map of Changuillo
- Country: Peru
- Region: Ica
- Province: Nazca
- Founded: January 12, 1945
- Capital: Changuillo

Government
  - Mayor: Carlos Moises Cabrera Solano

Area
  - Total: 946.94 km^{2} (365.62 sq mi)
- Elevation: 244 m (801 ft)

Population (2005 census)
  - Total: 2,214
  - Density: 2.338/km^{2} (6.056/sq mi)
- Time zone: UTC-5 (PET)
- UBIGEO: 110302

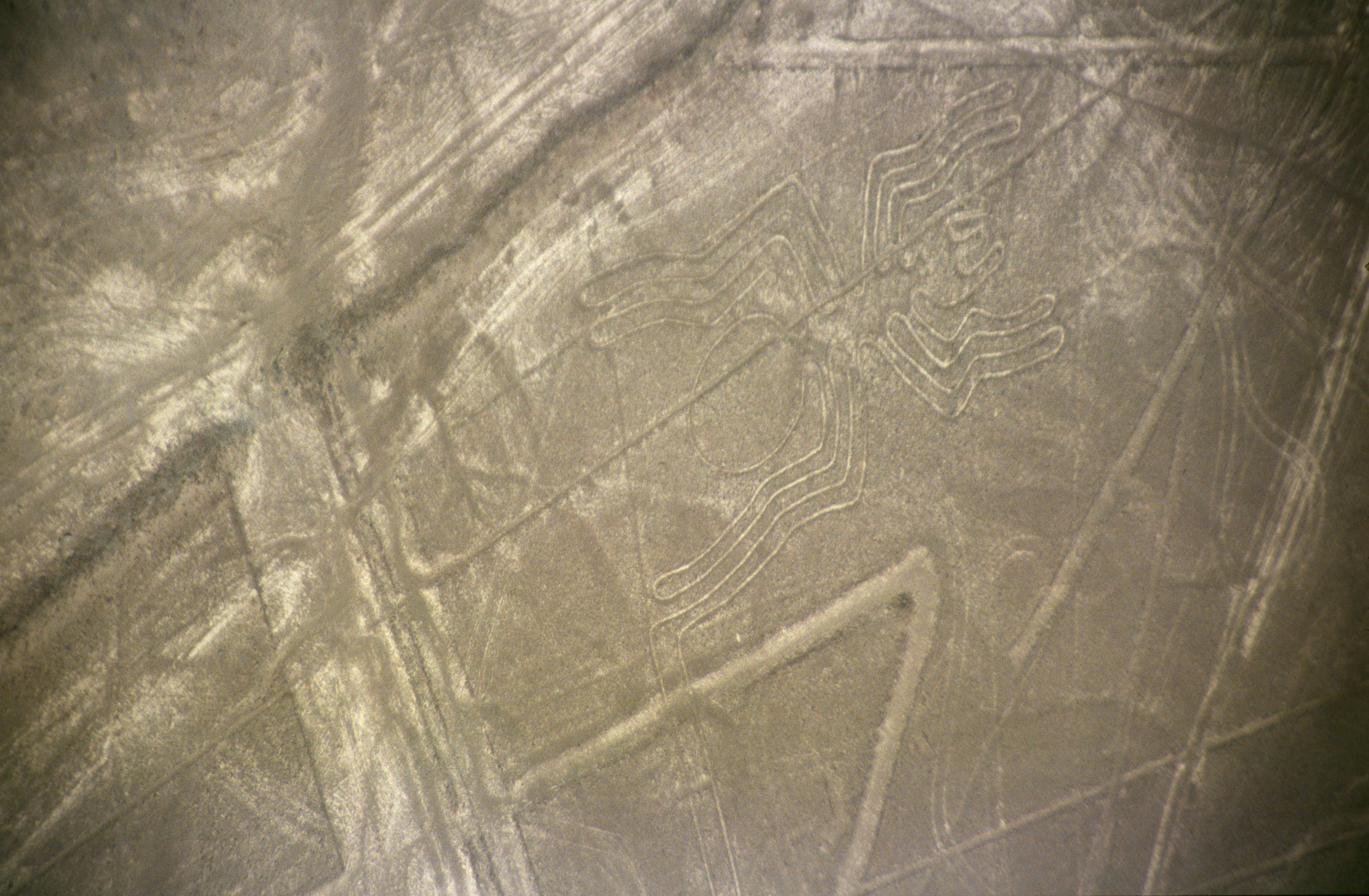

Changuillo District is one of five districts of the province Nazca in Peru.
