= El Ingenio District =

Provincial district in Peru

Coordinates: 14.6451°S 75.0584°W

El Ingenio
- District
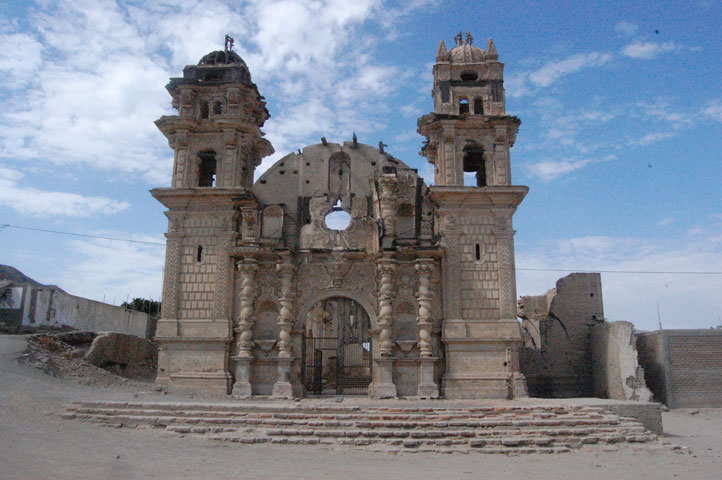
- Jesuit church San José, El Ingenio District
- Interactive map of El Ingenio
- Country: Peru
- Region: Ica
- Province: Nasca
- Founded: November 19, 1917
- Capital: El Ingenio

Government
  - Mayor: Victor Marcelo Caipo Flores

Area
  - Total: 552.39 km^{2} (213.28 sq mi)
- Elevation: 445 m (1,460 ft)

Population (2005 census)
  - Total: 3,343
  - Density: 6.052/km^{2} (15.67/sq mi)
- Time zone: UTC-5 (PET)
- UBIGEO: 110303

El Ingenio District is one of five districts of the province Nasca in Peru.
