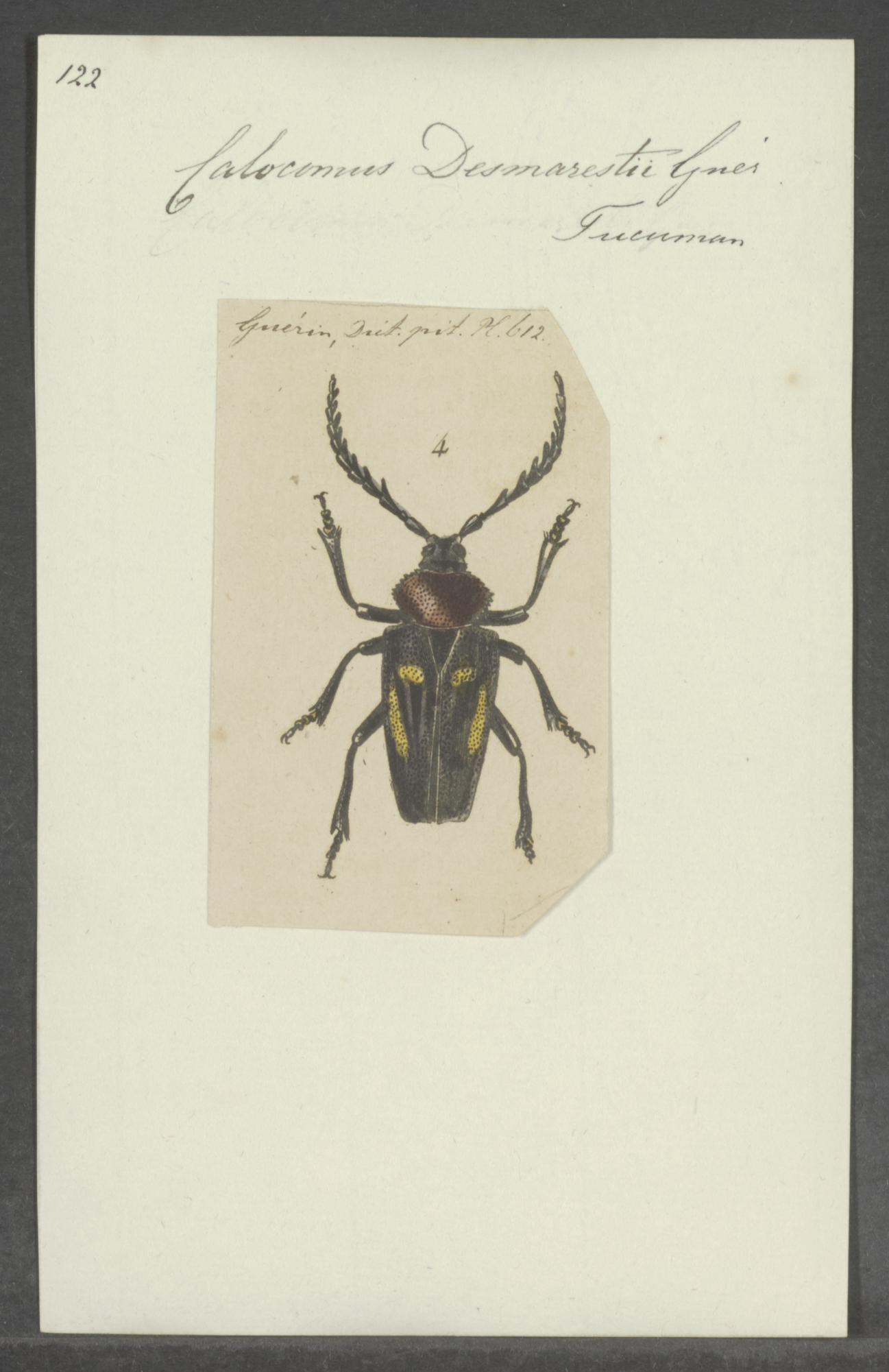

Scientific classification
- Kingdom: Animalia
- Phylum: Arthropoda
- Clade: Pancrustacea
- Class: Insecta
- Order: Coleoptera
- Suborder: Polyphaga
- Infraorder: Cucujiformia
- Family: Cerambycidae
- Subfamily: Prioninae
- Tribe: Calocomini
- Genus: Calocomus; Audinet-Serville 1832

= Calocomus =

Genus of beetles

Calocomus is a genus of longhorn beetles in the family Cerambycidae, containing the following species:

- Calocomus desmaresti (Guérin-Méneville, 1831)
- Calocomus kreuchelyi Buquet 1840
- Calocomus morosus White, 1850
- Calocomus rodingeri Tippmann, 1951
- Calocomus rugosipennis Lucas, 1857
