= La Tinguiña District =

Coordinates: 14.0390°S 75.7121°W

La Tinguiña
- District
- Interactive map of La Tinguiña
- Country: Peru
- Region: Ica
- Province: Ica
- Founded: December 28, 1961
- Capital: La Tinguiña

Government
  - Mayor: Ruben Ananias Velasquez Serna

Area
  - Total: 98.34 km^{2} (37.97 sq mi)
- Elevation: 432 m (1,417 ft)

Population (2005 census)
  - Total: 30,156
  - Density: 306.7/km^{2} (794.2/sq mi)
- Time zone: UTC-5 (PET)
- UBIGEO: 110102

La Tinguiña District is one of fourteen districts of the province Ica in Peru.

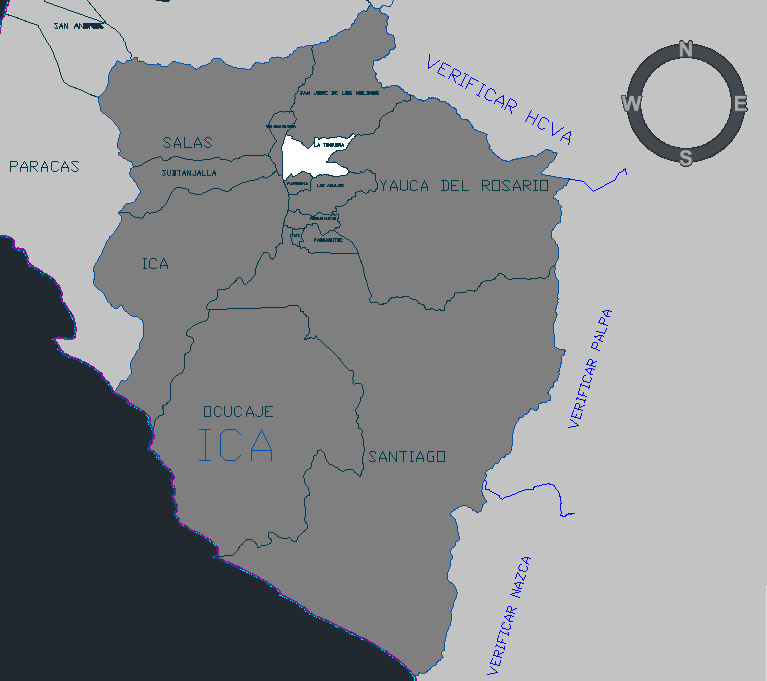
La Tinguiña District, part of Ica Province within Ica Region, Peru

== Climate ==
Climate data for Tacama, La Tinguiña, elevation 429 m (1,407 ft), (1991–2020)
Month	Jan	Feb	Mar	Apr	May	Jun	Jul	Aug	Sep	Oct	Nov	Dec	Year
Mean daily maximum °C (°F)	31.3 (88.3)	32.5 (90.5)	32.9 (91.2)	31.6 (88.9)	29.0 (84.2)	25.9 (78.6)	25.1 (77.2)	25.9 (78.6)	27.3 (81.1)	28.2 (82.8)	28.9 (84.0)	30.0 (86.0)	29.1 (84.3)
Mean daily minimum °C (°F)	17.9 (64.2)	18.8 (65.8)	18.0 (64.4)	15.5 (59.9)	12.3 (54.1)	10.9 (51.6)	10.3 (50.5)	10.6 (51.1)	11.2 (52.2)	12.2 (54.0)	13.4 (56.1)	15.9 (60.6)	13.9 (57.0)
Average precipitation mm (inches)	3.1 (0.12)	2.6 (0.10)	0.7 (0.03)	0.1 (0.00)	0.2 (0.01)	0.2 (0.01)	0.3 (0.01)	0.2 (0.01)	0.1 (0.00)	0.1 (0.00)	0.1 (0.00)	0.4 (0.02)	8.1 (0.31)
Source: National Meteorology and Hydrology Service of Peru
