= Subtanjalla District =

Coordinates: 14.0184°S 75.7584°W

Subtanjalla
- District
- Interactive map of Subtanjalla
- Country: Peru
- Region: Ica
- Province: Ica
- Founded: February 10, 1959
- Capital: Subtanjalla

Government
  - Mayor: Felix Benjamin León Florian

Area
  - Total: 193.97 km^{2} (74.89 sq mi)
- Elevation: 429 m (1,407 ft)

Population (2005 census)
  - Total: 16,931
  - Density: 87.287/km^{2} (226.07/sq mi)
- Time zone: UTC-5 (PET)
- UBIGEO: 110112

Subtanjalla District is one of fourteen districts of the province Ica in Peru.

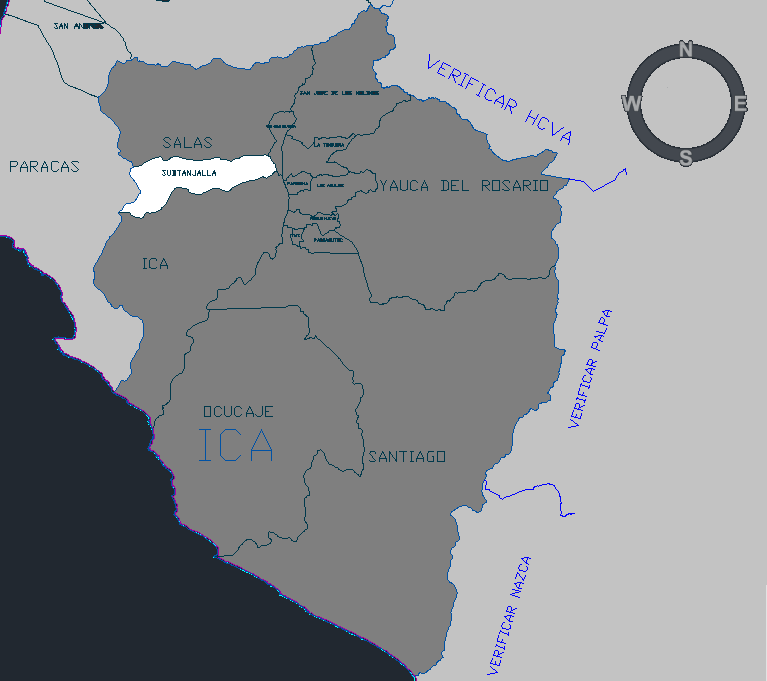
File:Subtanjalla district within Ica province of Ica region, Peru.
