= Santiago District, Ica =

Coordinates: 14.1856°S 75.7146°W

Santiago District
- District
- Interactive map of Santiago District
- Country: Peru
- Region: Ica
- Province: Ica
- Founded: October 31, 1870
- Capital: Santiago

Government
  - Mayor: Ismael Francisco Carpio Solis

Area
  - Total: 2,783.81 km^{2} (1,074.84 sq mi)
- Elevation: 374 m (1,227 ft)

Population (2005 census)
  - Total: 21,427
  - Density: 7.6970/km^{2} (19.935/sq mi)
- Time zone: UTC-5 (PET)
- UBIGEO: 110111

Santiago District is one of fourteen districts of the province Ica in Peru.

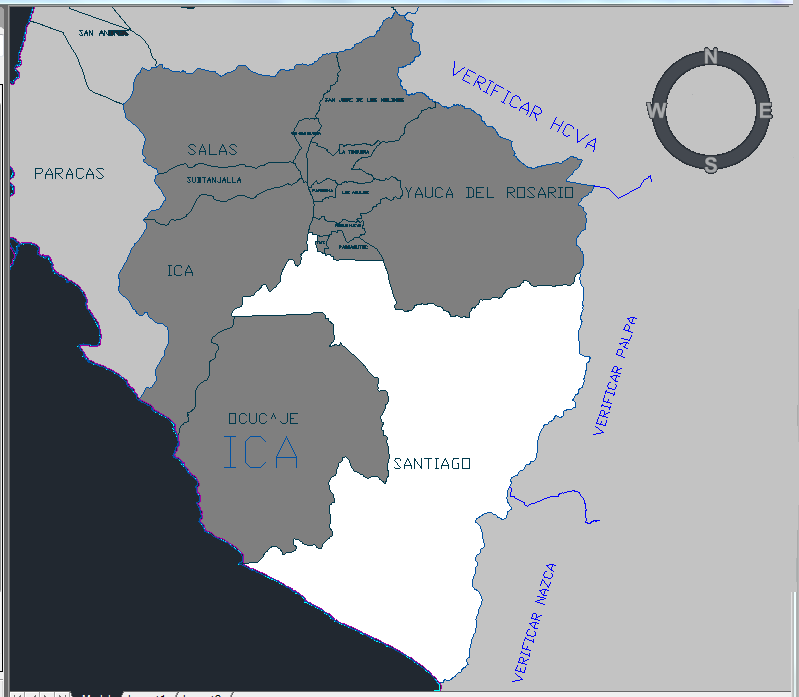
Santiago District, within Ica Province, part of Ica Region.
