= Nazca =

Archaeological site and modern city in Peru

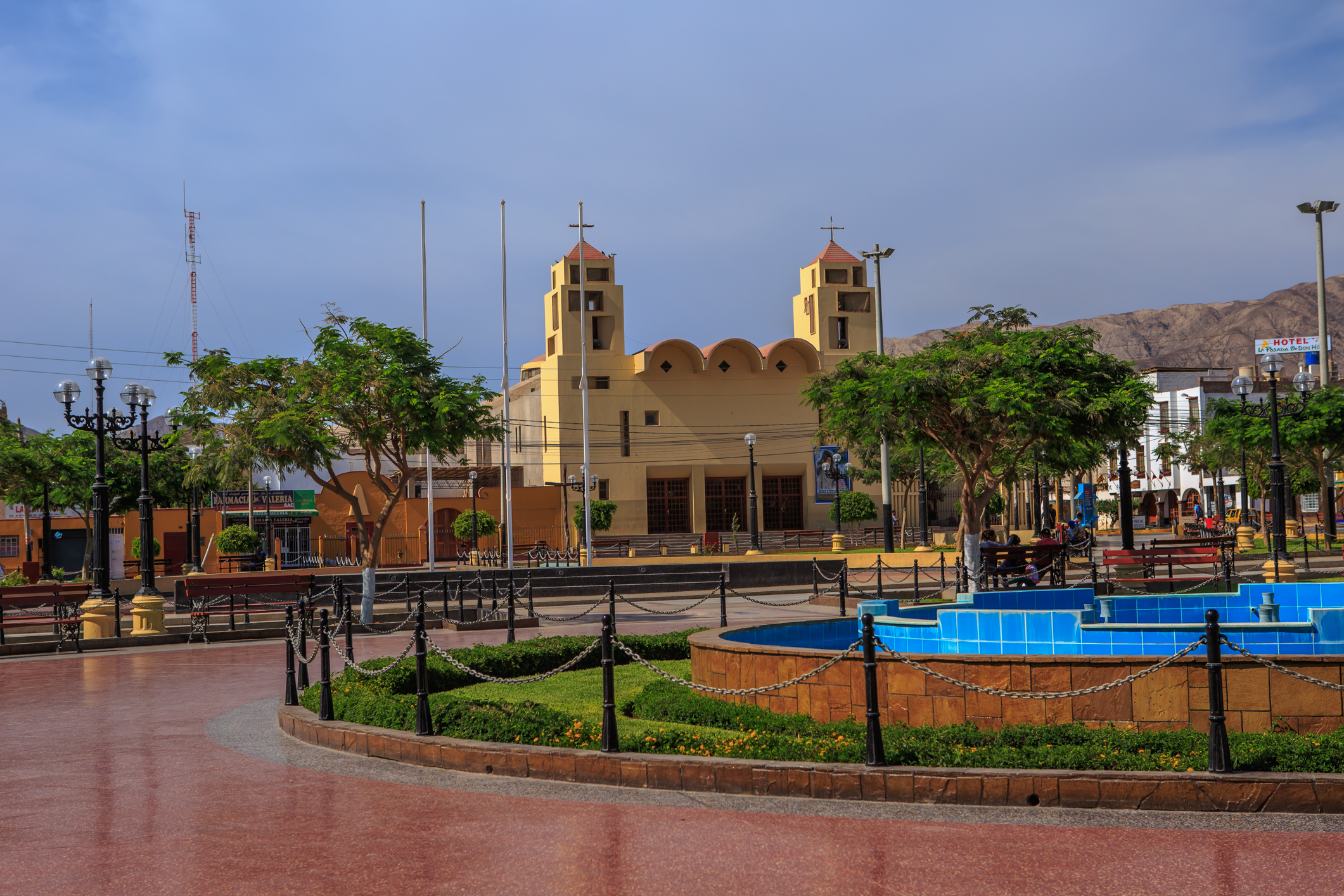
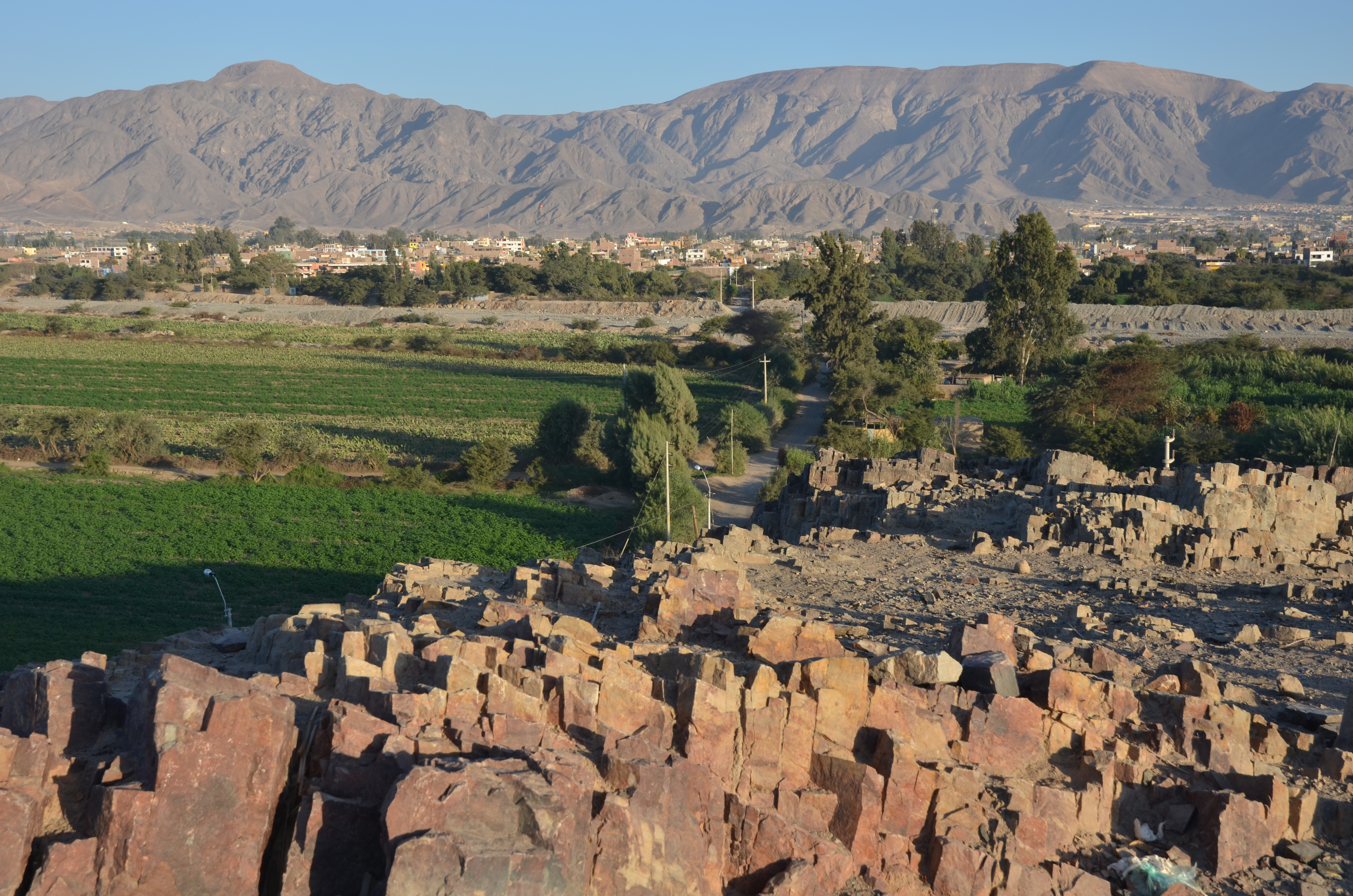
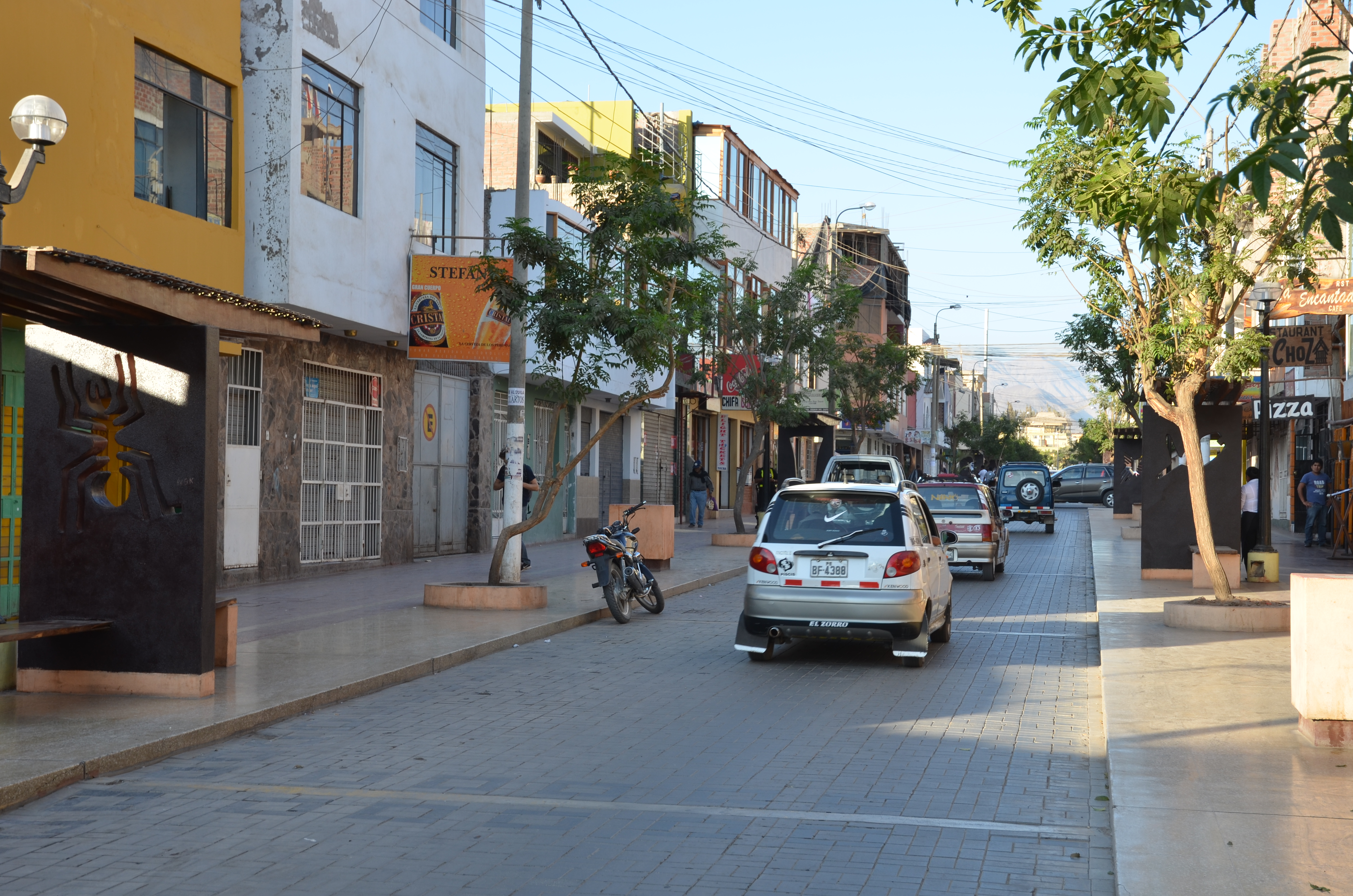
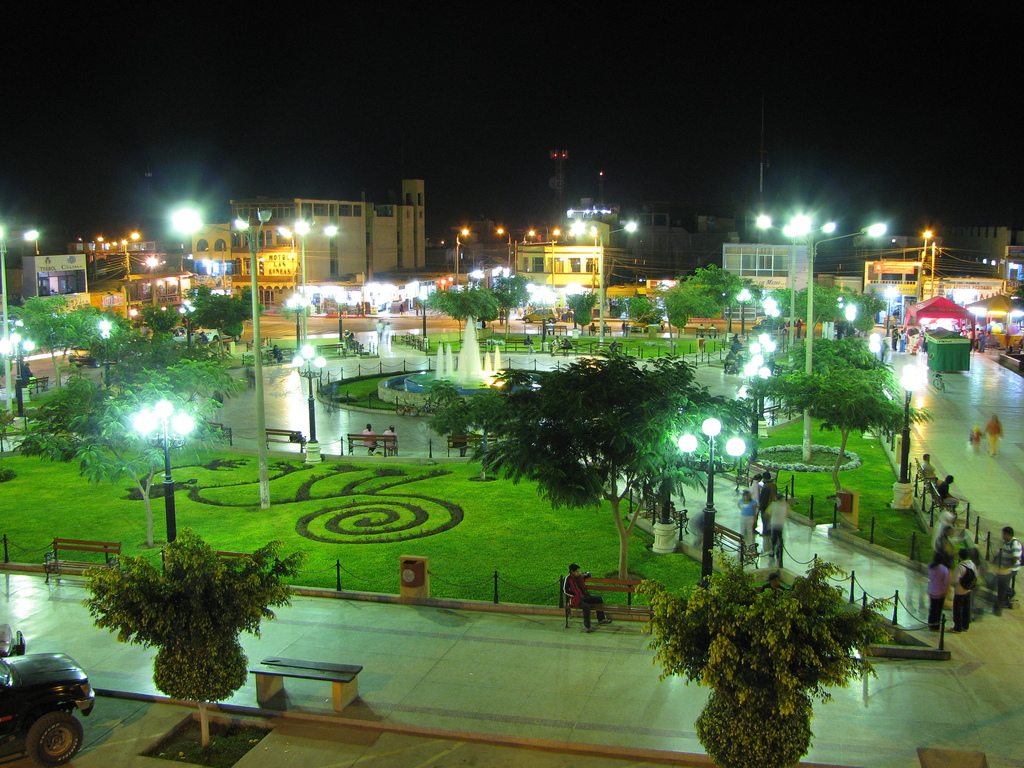
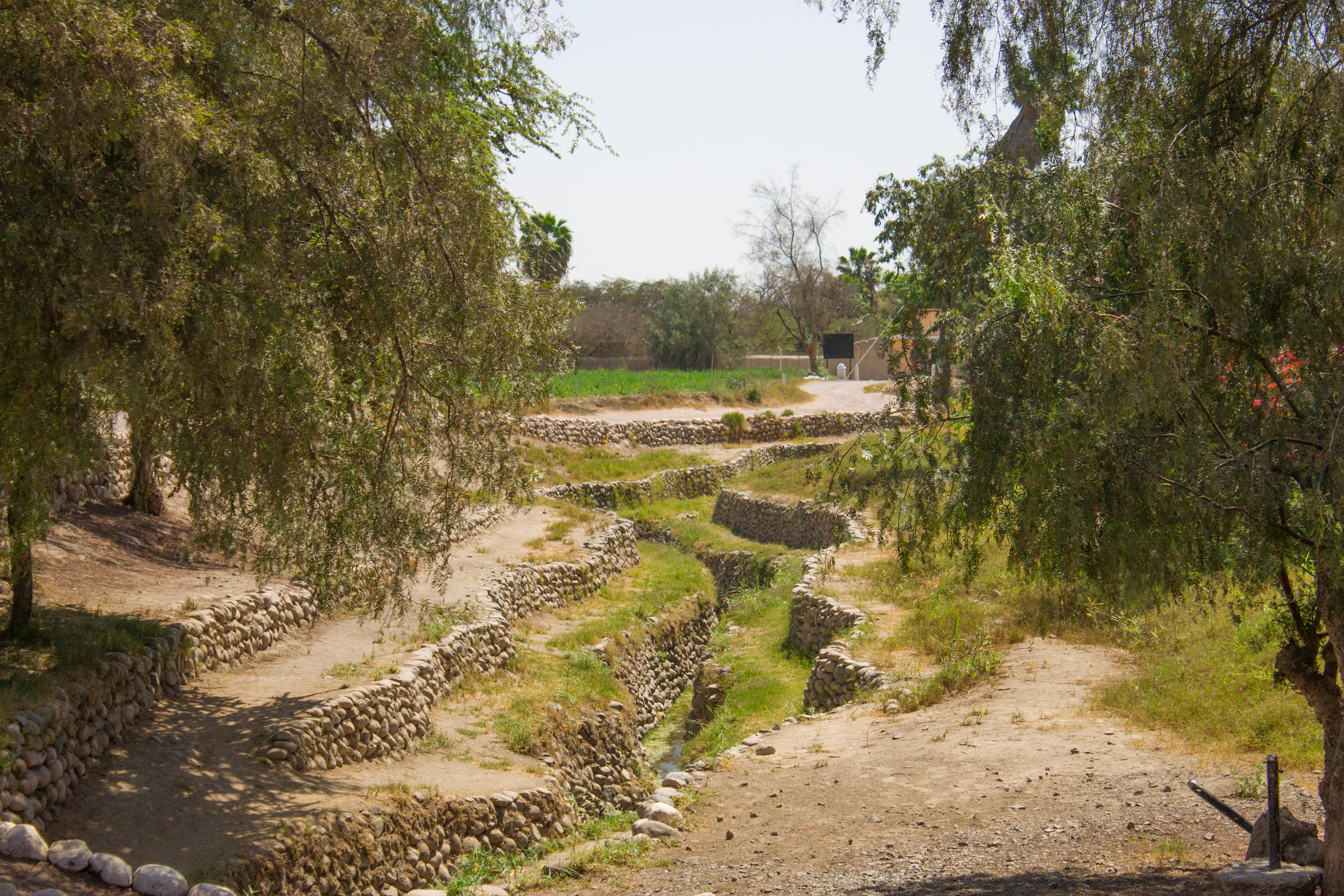
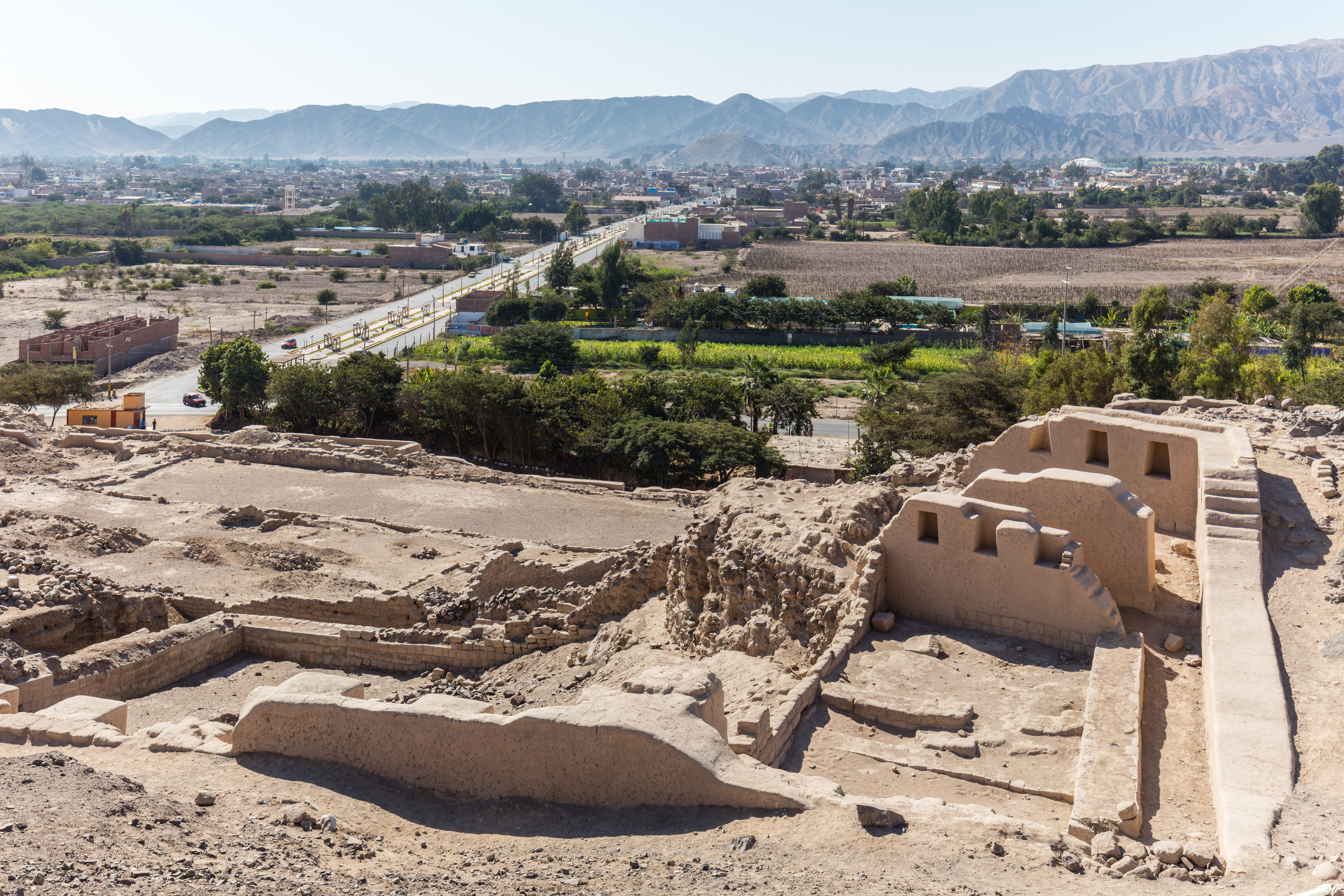
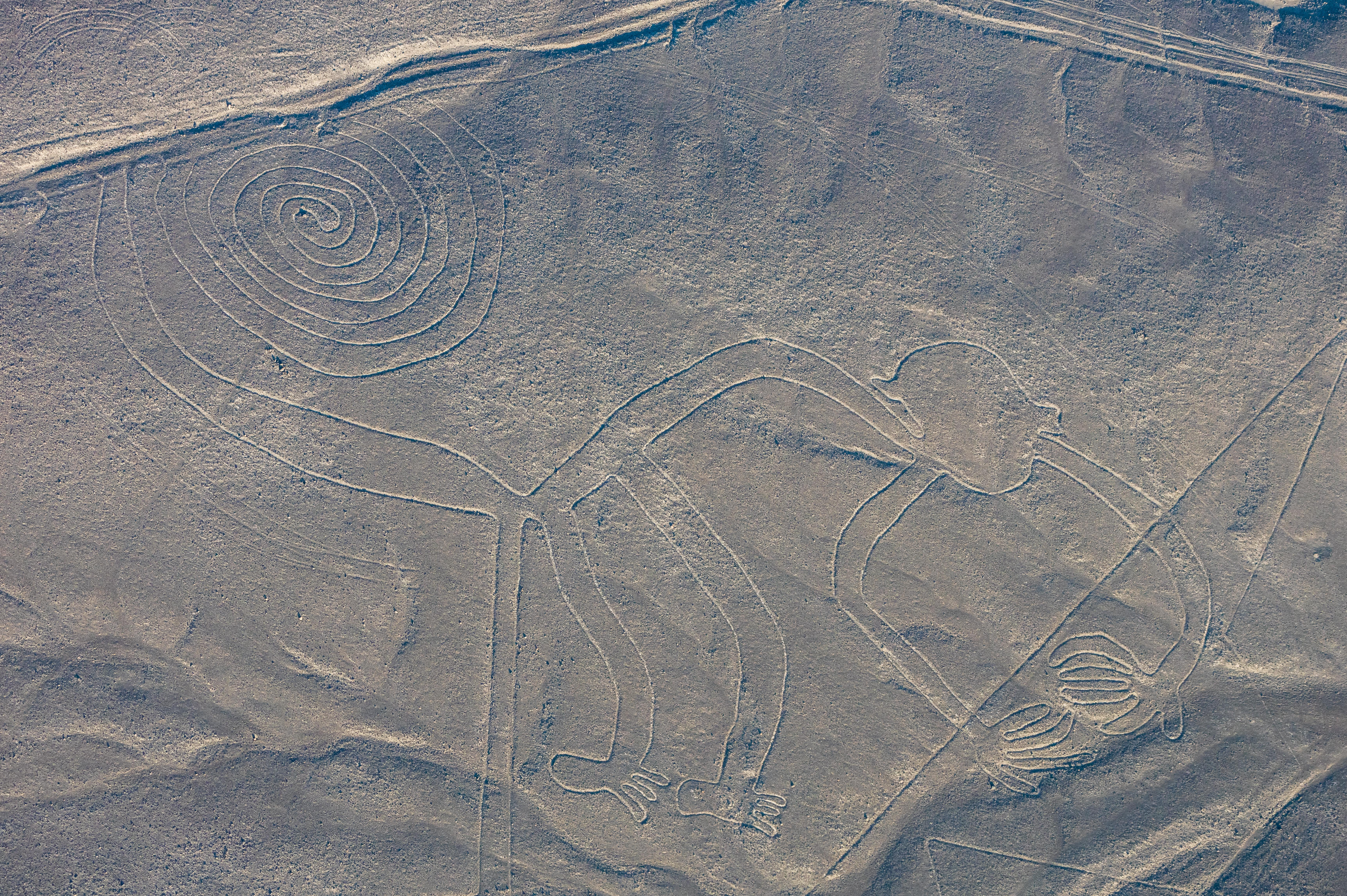

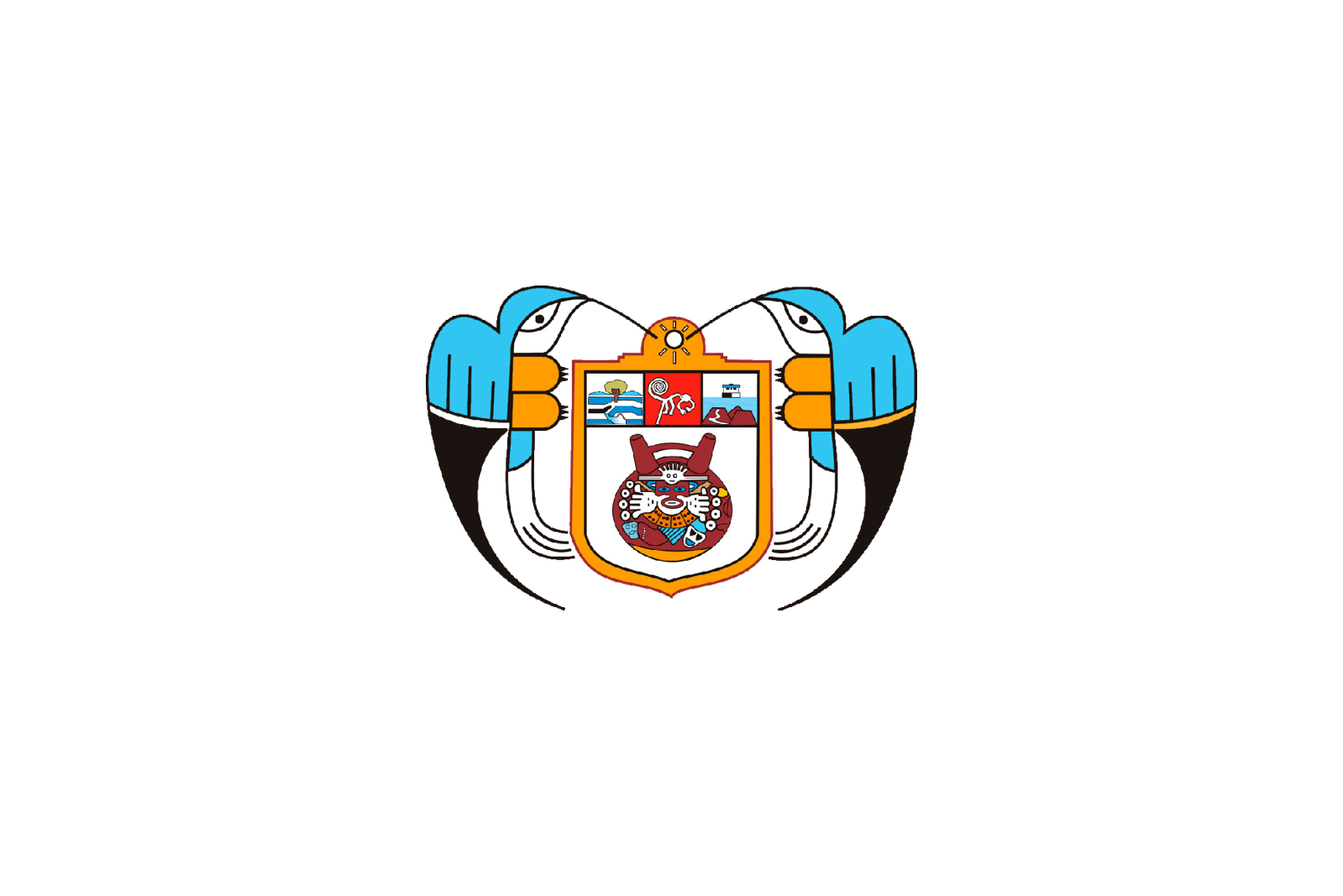
- Flag

- Location within Peru
- Coordinates: 14°49′44″S 74°56′37″W
- Country: Peru
- Region: Ica
- Province: Nazca
- Founded: 17 November 1591

Government
  - Mayor: Julio Oscar Elías Lucana
- Elevation: 520 m (1,710 ft)

Population (2022)
  - Total: 50,800

Nazca (/ˈnɑːskɑː, -kə/; sometimes spelled Nasca; possibly from Quechua: nanasqa, lit. 'hurt') is a city and system of valleys on the southern coast of Peru. The city of Nazca is the largest in the Nazca Province. The name is derived from the Nazca culture, which flourished in the area between 100 BC and AD 800. This culture was responsible for the Nazca Lines and the ceremonial city of Cahuachi. They also constructed additional underground aqueducts, named puquios, in a regional system that still functions today. The first puquios are believed to have been built by the preceding Paracas culture.

Nazca is the capital of the Nazca Province located in the Ica District of the Ica Region of Peru.

== Earthquake ==
On November 12, 1996, at 11:59 a.m. local time (16:59 GMT) there was an earthquake of magnitude 7.5 with its epicenter at 7.7 km into the sea. The earthquake almost completely destroyed the city of Nazca and its surroundings. Due to its occurrence during the day, there were only 14 fatalities. However, 1,500 people were injured and around 100,000 were left homeless. Within 12 years Nazca has been almost completely rebuilt.

Since 1997, Nazca has been the location of a major Canadian gold mining operation. The indigenous people at the time did not own the rights to their traditional communal lands. As a result, they were forcibly displaced. Since then, they have sought to legalize their ancient ownership of land and fixed property.

== Geography ==
=== Climate ===
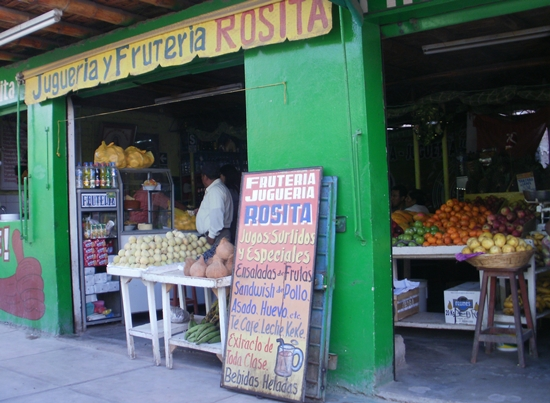
A fruit stand with sandwiches open early for breakfast in Nazca near the main farmers market

Nazca is one of the most arid regions in the world, with an average annual precipitation of 4 millimeters. Nazca's weather is controlled by the Humboldt Current, which carries water from Antarctica up the west coast of South America.

This cold ocean water cools the air and limits the accumulation of moisture within clouds; as a result, though clouds and fog are able to form, there is little rain.

Nazca's temperatures range from 10 to 32 °C with an average daily high of 21 °C. Summer months from November to March are dry, sunny, and hot. During the winter from June to August, fog from the coast rolls over the hills to keep temperatures in the moderate range; however, the intense sun makes daylight hours seem hotter than they are.

Climate data for Nazca
Month	Jan	Feb	Mar	Apr	May	Jun	Jul	Aug	Sep	Oct	Nov	Dec	Year
Mean daily maximum °C (°F)	31.8 (89.2)	32.4 (90.3)	32.6 (90.7)	31.6 (88.9)	29.9 (85.8)	27.6 (81.7)	27.0 (80.6)	28.2 (82.8)	29.7 (85.5)	31.1 (88.0)	31.5 (88.7)	31.8 (89.2)	30.4 (86.7)
Mean daily minimum °C (°F)	17.5 (63.5)	18.1 (64.6)	17.2 (63.0)	15.6 (60.1)	11.3 (52.3)	8.1 (46.6)	7.2 (45.0)	7.9 (46.2)	9.3 (48.7)	11.5 (52.7)	13.4 (56.1)	15.9 (60.6)	12.8 (55.0)
Average precipitation mm (inches)	0.7 (0.03)	0.8 (0.03)	0.2 (0.01)	0.0 (0.0)	0.0 (0.0)	0.0 (0.0)	0.3 (0.01)	0.0 (0.0)	0.0 (0.0)	0.0 (0.0)	0.0 (0.0)	0.1 (0.00)	2.1 (0.08)
Source: SENAMHI

== History ==
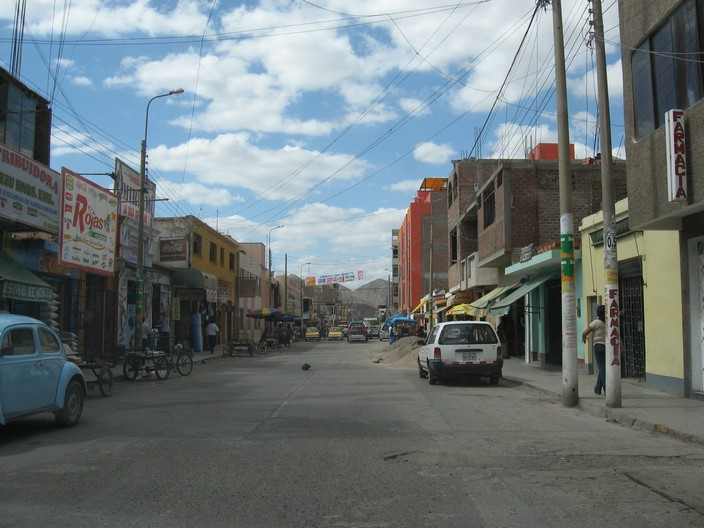
The city of Nazca

There are two versions of the Spanish foundation. According to the writings of chroniclers, the city was founded on October 28, 1548, commissioned by Pedro de la Gasca, peacemaker by Alonso de Mendoza. The other version states that it was founded in 1591 by the Viceroy García Hurtado de Mendoza, 5th Marquis of Cañete.

During the Spanish colonial period, Nazca was known for viticulture, producing wine and grape brandy (aguardiente de la uva). Today this is commonly called pisco, after the famous port of the same name. Locally, the brandy is known as Nasca. These products were widely distributed throughout the viceroyalty of Peru and beyond.

The largest of the Nazca vineyards were located in the rich Ingenio Valley, and were property of the Society of Jesus, Jesuit missionaries and priests. The hacienda San Joseph de la Nasca, located in the upper part of the middle Ingenio Valley, was owned by the Jesuit College of Cuzco. San Francisco Xavier de la Nasca, in the lower part of the middle valley, was owned by the Jesuit College of San Pablo in Lima. Both of these estates used numerous workers who were enslaved persons of sub-Saharan African descent. In addition to producing wines and brandies, both estates had substantial infrastructure for producing the ceramic storage jars, known as botijas, in which the wine and brandy was transported.

Today, the towns of San Javier and San José are known for the ruins of the large 18th-century baroque churches built during the Jesuit administration of these estates. In 1767, following the expulsion of the Society of Jesus by King Charles III of Spain, the Crown confiscated and administered these properties as royal estates.

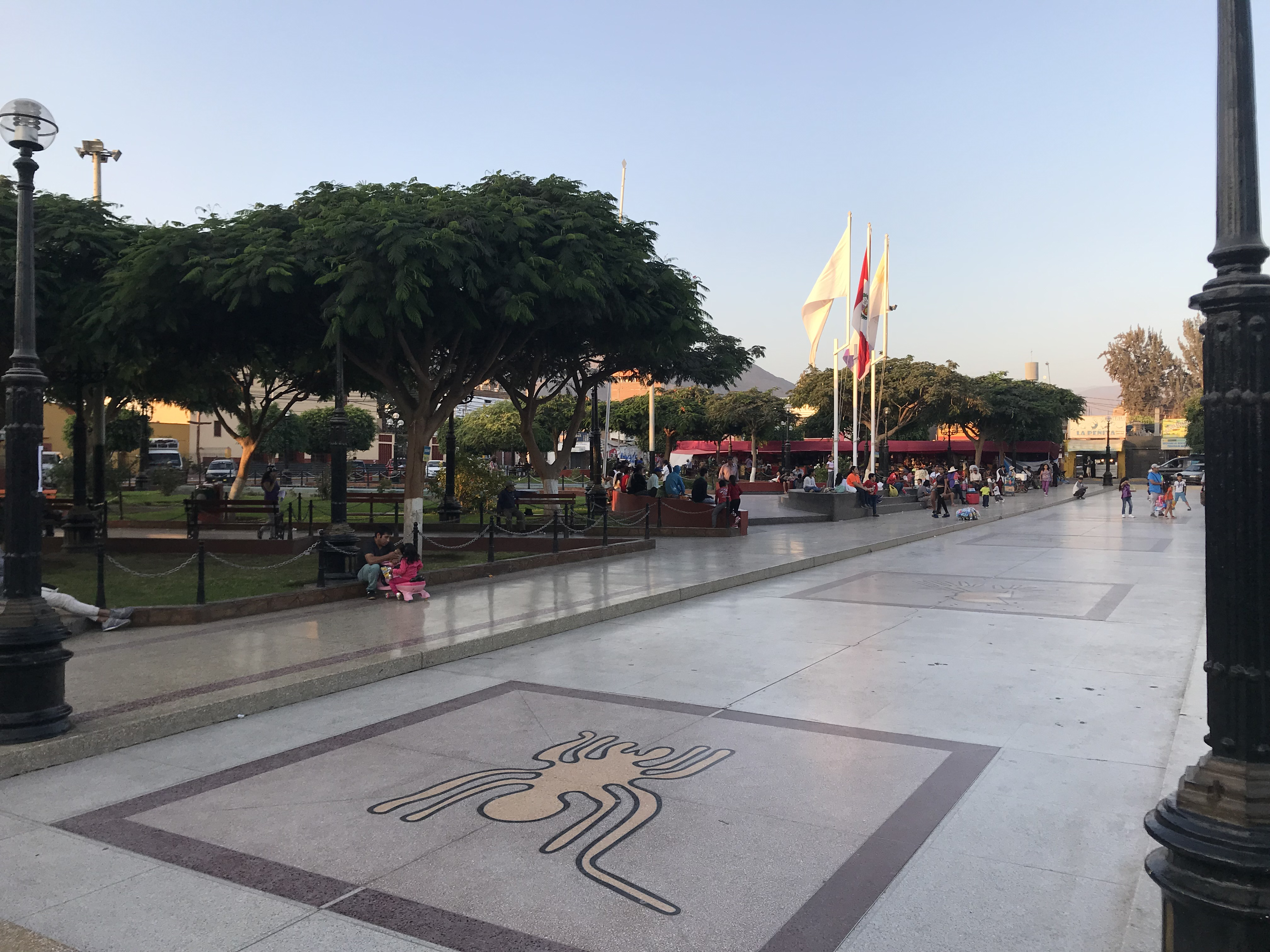
Nazca city square

Nazca Patriots received the Liberating Expedition of General Don Jose de San Martin on October 14, 1820, after they escaped from the Battle of Nasca. Two days earlier, on October 12, General Juan Antonio Álvarez de Arenales, from Ica, was sent to the South in pursuit of the royal troops of Colonel Manuel Quimper fleeing from Ica. The second commander and chief of staff of the Division de la Sierra, was Argentine Lieutenant Colonel Manuel Rojas Argerich. He commanded 250 men: 110 infantry and 140 cavalry.

The town of Nasca was established on August 29, 1821. On July 2, 1855, it was elevated to a district and then it became a province on January 23, 1941.

Nasca, as the name is spelled in the 21st century, still has a dry climate. Before and during the time of the Inca, it had a formidable system of hydraulic engineering. The water was accessed through filtration galleries from underground branches, called aqueducts. The openings to the system were called puquios. More than three dozen continue to operate, to irrigate farmland and provide domestic needs.

== Nazca lines ==
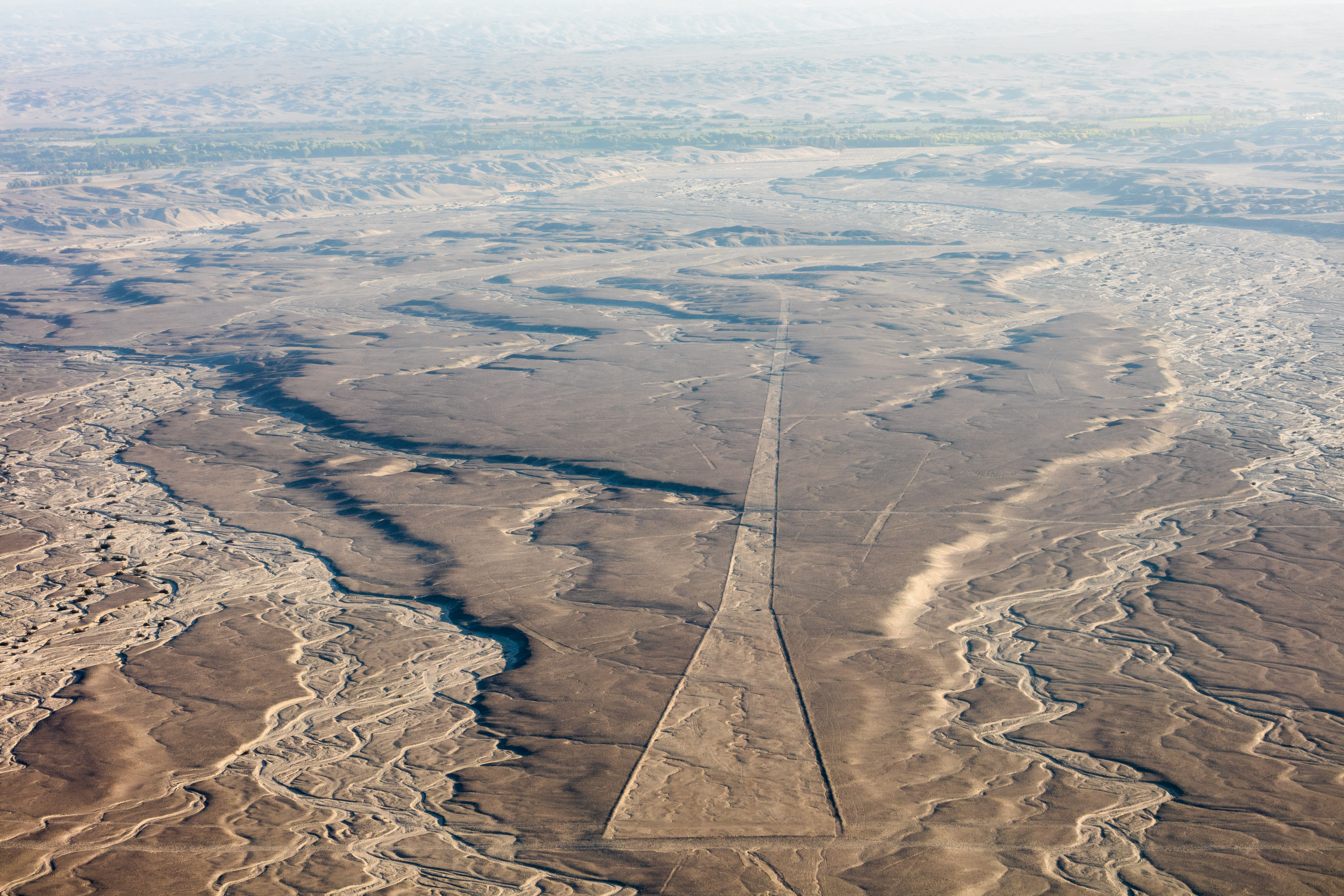
Nazca lines

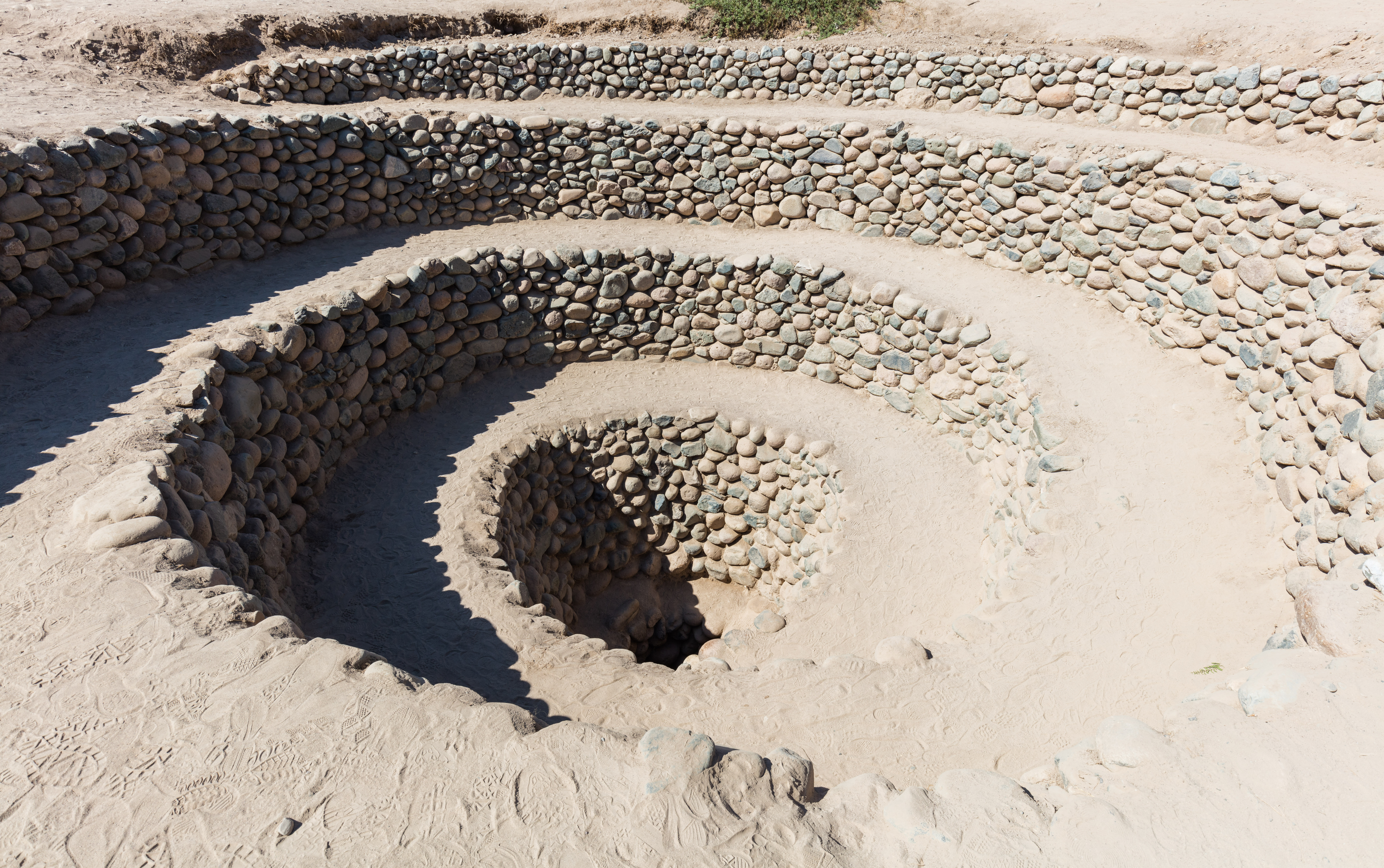
Underground Cantalloc Aqueducts

The Nazca culture is famous for its desert line drawings, the product of complex construction projects carried out by a hierarchical society from 500 BC to AD 500. Contrary to the popular belief that the lines and figures can be seen only from an aircraft, they are also visible from the surrounding foothills and other high places. There are innumerable formations of both animals and geometric designs.

Local tour companies sell flights (sobrevueltos) over 12 main figures, the most famous of which are the hummingbird, the condor, and the monkey. The spiral tail of the monkey inspired the spiral in the "P" of the Perú logo, which is also found on its currency. UNESCO declared the Nazca Lines a World Heritage Site in 1994.

== Airport ==
Nazca has a small airport, the Maria Reiche Neuman Airport, used mainly for touristic flights over the Nazca lines. It was named for a woman who did much to study the Nazca lines and bring them to international attention as products of pre-Hispanic man.

== Notable people ==
- Maria Reiche (1903-1998), archaeologist
- Jenny de la Torre Castro (1954-2025), physician
- Martina Portocarrero (1949-2022), folk singer, cultural researcher, politician
