= Ica province =

Coordinates: 14°04′S 75°44′W

Ica
- Province
- Flag Coat of arms

- Location of Ica in the Ica Region
- Country: Peru
- Region: Ica
- Capital: Ica

Government
  - Mayor: Emma Luisa Mejía Venegas (2019-2022)

Area
  - Total: 7,894.25 km^{2} (3,047.99 sq mi)

Population (2005 census)
  - Total: 297,771
  - Density: 37.7200/km^{2} (97.6943/sq mi)
- UBIGEO: 1101
- Website: www.muniica.gob.pe

Ica is the largest of five provinces of the Ica Region in Peru. The capital of the province is the city of Ica.

Huacachina is a small town, oasis and resort in this region.

== Political division ==
The province of Ica is divided into fourteen districts (Spanish: distritos, singular: distrito), each of which is headed by a mayor (alcalde):

=== Districts ===
- Ica
- La Tinguiña
- Los Aquijes
- Ocucaje
- Pachacute
- Parcona
- Pueblo Nuevo
- Salas
- San José de los Molinos
- San Juan Bautista
- Santiago
- Subtanjalla
- Tate
- Yauca del Rosario

== Villages and towns ==
- Comatrana

== See also ==
- Administrative divisions of Peru
