= Maria Reiche =

Peruvian archaeologist, mathematician and technical translator (1903–1998)

OSP Maria Reiche
- Maria Reiche in 1986
- Born: 15 May 1903; Dresden, German Empire
- Died: 8 June 1998 (aged 95); Santiago de Surco, Lima, Peru
- Education: Dresden Technical University
- Known for: Nazca Lines
- Scientific career
- Fields: Archaeology

Maria Reiche Grosse-Neumann (15 May 1903 – 8 June 1998) was a German-born Peruvian mathematician, archaeologist, and technical translator. She is known for her research into the Nazca Lines, which she first saw in 1941 together with American historian Paul Kosok. Known as the "Lady of the Lines", Reiche made the documentation, preservation and public dissemination of the Nazca Lines her life's work.

She was widely recognized as the curator of the lines and lived nearby to protect them. She received recognition as Doctor Honoris Causa by the National University of San Marcos and the Universidad Nacional de Ingeniería in Lima. Reiche helped gain national and international attention for the Nazca Lines; Peru established protection, and they were designated a UNESCO World Heritage Site in 1994.

Following her death, her former home in Nazca was converted into a museum, the Museo Maria Reiche. She is honored as the namesake of Maria Reiche Neuman Airport in Nazca, the Park Maria Reiche in Miraflores and of some fifty schools and other institutions in Peru. The 115th anniversary of her birth was commemorated with a Google Doodle in May 2018.

== Early life and education ==
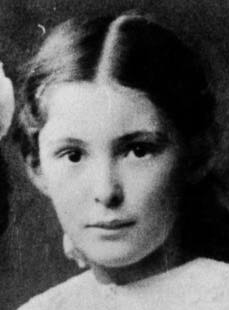
Reiche in 1910

Maria Reiche was born in Dresden on 15 May 1903 to Felix Reiche Grosse and Ana Elizabeth Neumann. She studied mathematics, astronomy, geography and foreign languages at the Technische Universität Dresden. She learned to speak five languages.

In 1932 as a young woman, she went to Peru to work as a governess and tutor for the children of the German consul in Cusco. In 1934, while still in Cusco, she accidentally stabbed herself with a cactus and lost a finger to gangrene.

In 1939, she became a teacher in Lima and also worked on scientific translations. When World War II broke out that year, Reiche stayed in Peru. The next year she met American Paul Kosok, who was researching ancient irrigation systems in the country. She assisted him with making arrangements in the country, including a flight in 1941 by which she first saw the lines and figures of Nazca from the air. They collaborated for years on further studies of these earthworks, trying to determine how they were made and, with more difficulty, for what purpose.

== Nazca lines ==
In 1940, Reiche became an assistant to Paul Kosok, an American historian from Long Island University in Brooklyn, New York, who was studying ancient irrigation systems in Peru.

In June 1941 Kosok noticed lines in the desert that converged at the point of the winter solstice in the Southern Hemisphere. Together, he and Reiche began to map and assess the lines for their relation to astronomical events. Later Reiche found lines converging at the summer solstice and developed the theory that the lines formed a large-scale celestial calendar. Around 1946, Reiche began to map the figures represented by the Nazca Lines and determined there were 18 different kinds of animals and birds.

After Kosok left in 1948, after his second study period in Peru, Reiche continued the work and mapped the area. She used her background as a mathematician to analyze how the Nazca may have created such huge-scale figures. She found these to have a mathematical precision that was highly sophisticated. Reiche theorized that the builders of the lines used them as a sun calendar and an observatory for astronomical cycles.

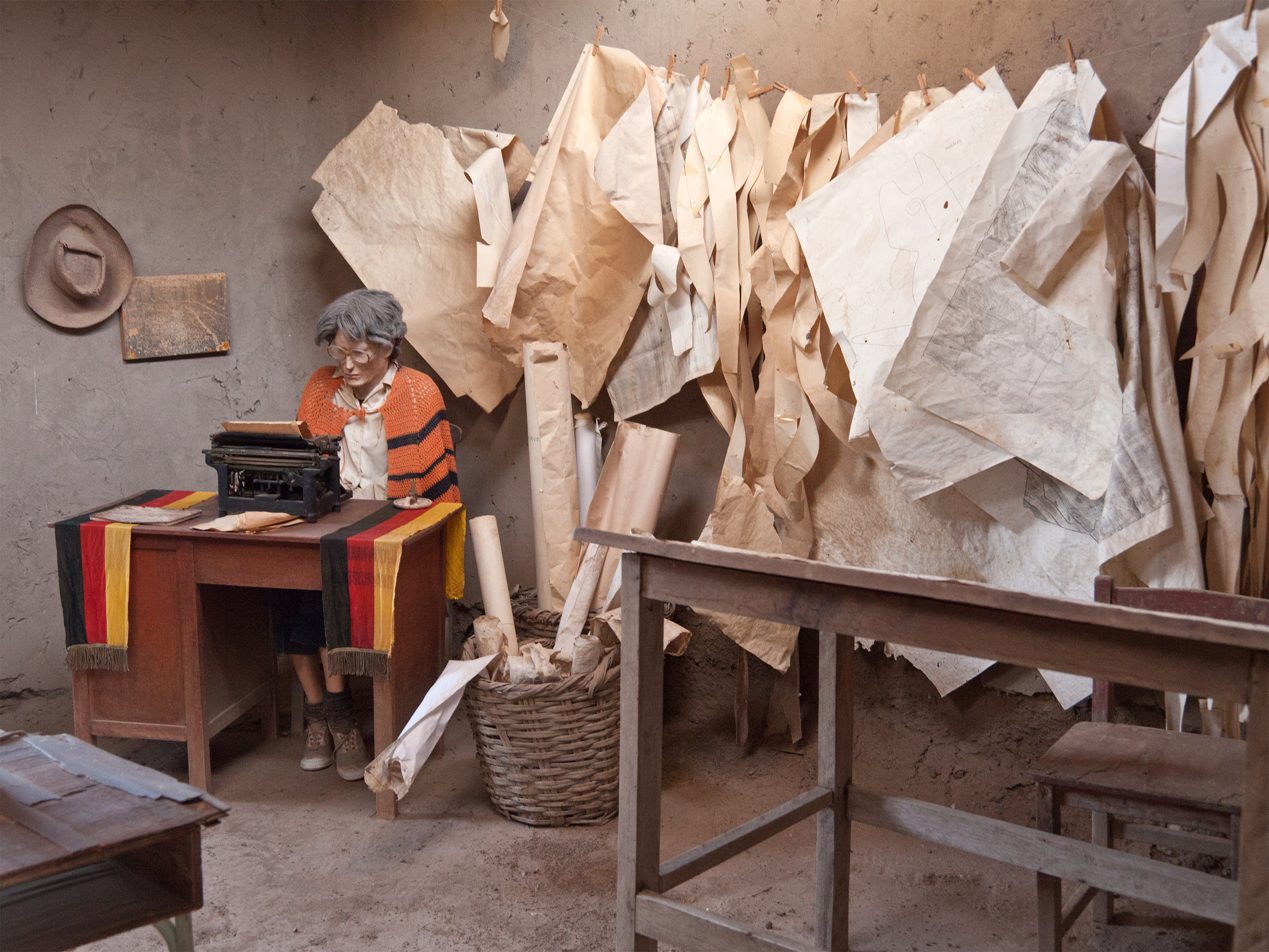
Wax figure of Reiche in her former home, now a museum dedicated to her work

Because the lines can be best seen from above, she persuaded the Peruvian Air Force to help her make aerial photographic surveys. She worked alone from her home in Nazca. Reiche published her theories in the book The Mystery on the Desert (1949, reprint 1968). She believed that the large drawing of a giant monkey represented the constellation now called Ursa Major (Great Bear). Her book had a mixed response from scholars. Eventually scholars concluded that the lines were not chiefly for astronomical purposes, but Reiche's and Kosok's work had brought scholarly attention to the great resource. Some researchers believe that the lines were made as part of worship and religious ceremonies related to the "calling of water from the gods."

Reiche used the profits from the book to campaign for preservation of the Nazca desert and to hire guards for the property and assistants for her work. Wanting to preserve the Nazca Lines from encroaching traffic after one figure was cut through by the Pan American Highway government development, Reiche spent considerable money in the effort to lobby and educate officials and the public about the lines. After paying for private security, she convinced the government to restrict public access to the area. She sponsored construction of a tower near the highway so that visitors could have an overview of the lines to appreciate them without damaging them. Reiche contributed to the lines becoming a World Heritage site in 1994.

In 1977, Reiche became a founding member of South American Explorers, a non-profit travel, scientific and educational organization. She was on the organization's advisory board and was interviewed for the South American Explorer on the lines' significance and importance.

=== Reception ===
Reiche's work on the Nazca Lines is both pioneering and the subject of criticism. She devoted her life to documenting and preserving these geoglyphs, arguing that they represented an astronomical calendar used by the ancient Nazca people. This thesis, developed as early as the 1940s, raised international awareness of the site's scientific and heritage value, ultimately contributing to its classification as a UNESCO World Heritage Site. However, Reiche's astronomical interpretations have been widely challenged in subsequent studies, notably those of Gerald Hawkins and Anthony Aveni, who demonstrated that the lines' orientations do not exhibit any statistically significant correlation with recurring celestial phenomena. Reiche's model has been criticized as being based on isolated correlations, without methodical validation using a rigorous protocol.

== Personal life ==
Reiche once confessed that at age 40, she passionately fell in love with one of her students, but never said the name. She only said he was "a red-haired man with freckles". According to her long-time friend Clorinda Caller, he was a young Jew who may have had poliomyelitis. This man spoke several languages and also worked as a UN translator.

Reiche's partner was Amy Meredith, who not only was the first person to fund her work, but also played a key role in Maria's interest in the Nazca lines, since she ran a tearoom — called the "Panamerican" — where many intellectuals gathered, including Julio C. Tello and Paul Kosok. It was in this place where Reiche got to meet both scientists. The death of Meredith in January 1960 had a huge impact on Maria's life.

Reiche's health deteriorated as she aged. She used a wheelchair, suffered from skin ailments, and lost her sight. In her later years, she also suffered from Parkinson's disease. At the age of 90 she published Contributions to Geometry and Astronomy in Ancient Peru. Maria Reiche died of ovarian cancer on 8 June 1998, at Fuerza Aérea del Perú (Peruvian Air Force) Hospital, at Las Palmas Air Base in Santiago de Surco, Lima, Peru. Reiche was buried with her sister, Dr Renate Reiche-Grosse, near Nazca with official honors. A street and school in Nazca are named for her.
