= Maria Reiche Neuman Airport =

Maria Reiche Neuman Airport Nazca Airport
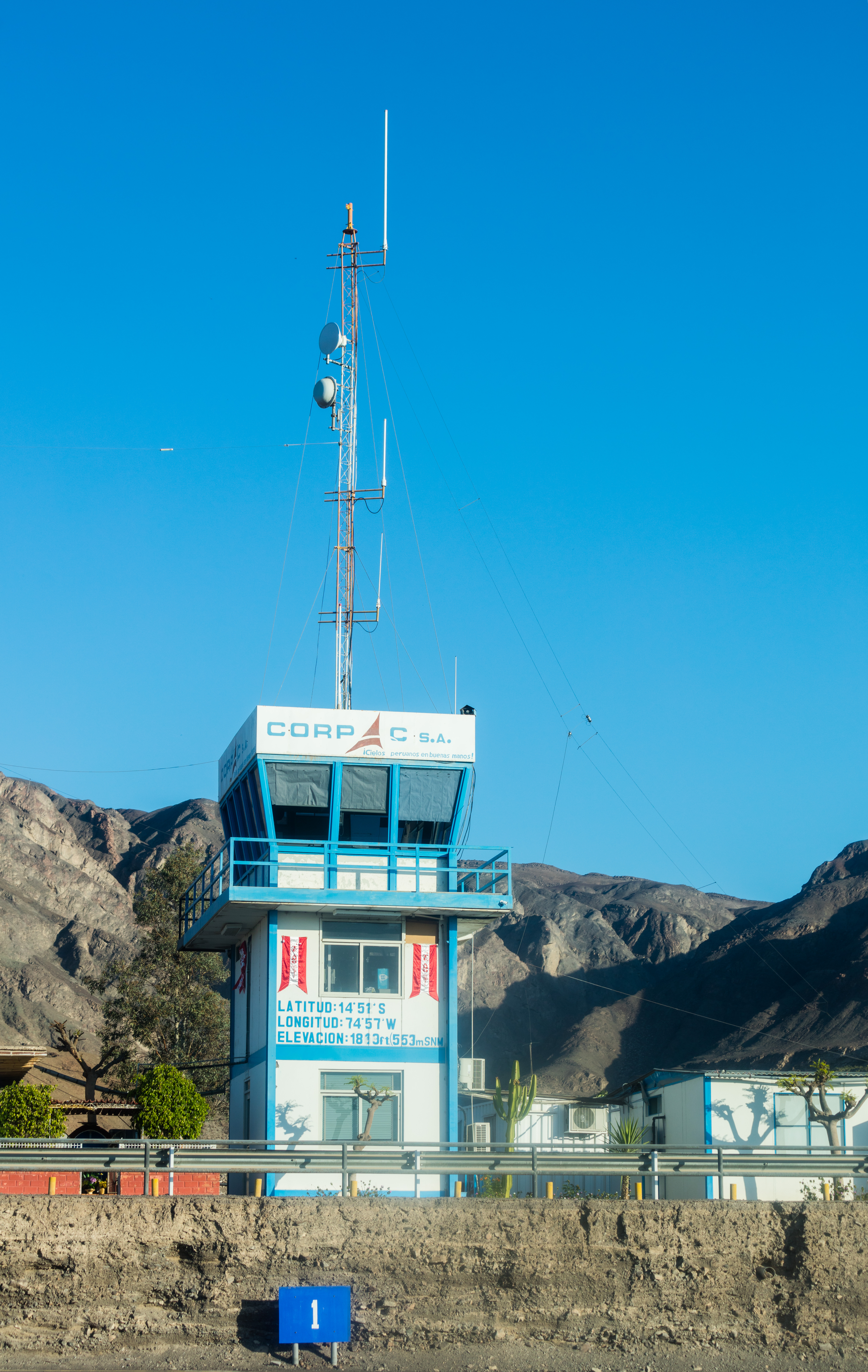
- IATA: NZC; ICAO: SPZA

Summary
- Operator: CORPAC
- Location: Nazca, Ica, Peru
- Elevation AMSL: 1,860 ft (570 m)
- Coordinates: 14°51′15″S 74°57′40″W

Map
- Location of the airport in Peru

Runways
| Direction | Length | | Surface |
| Direction | m | ft | Surface |
|---|---|---|---|
| 07/25 | 1,004 | 3,294 | Asphalt |
- Sources: GCM WAD

The Maria Reiche Neuman Airport (IATA: NZC, ICAO: SPZA) is a small airport serving Nazca, in the Ica Region of Peru. The airport is named after Maria Reiche, a principal researcher and proponent of the Nazca Lines.

The airport receives a small number of domestic charter flights. The main use of the airport is for tourist flights over the Nazca Lines. Aerodiana, AirMajoro, Aero Paracas, Aero Nasca, Alas Peruanas, and MovilAir operate charter flights over the Nazca Lines

On October 23, 2025, NZC was featured as a Jeopardy! Final Jeopardy question.

== Accidents and incidents ==
- On 10 June 2010, an AeroDiana Cessna 208 on a sightseeing flight over the Nazca Lines went missing. Authorities suspected hijack, as a number of passengers had false identities. The pilot and co-pilot later were found alive, but there has been no sign of the aircraft and the remaining passengers since.

== See also ==
- Transport in Peru
- List of airports in Peru
