= Parcona District =

Coordinates: 14.0483°S 75.7068°W

Parcona
- District
- Interactive map of Parcona
- Country: Peru
- Region: Ica
- Province: Ica
- Founded: March 17, 1962
- Capital: Parcona

Government
  - Mayor: Javier Gallegos Barrientos

Area
  - Total: 17.39 km^{2} (6.71 sq mi)
- Elevation: 440 m (1,440 ft)

Population (2005 census)
  - Total: 46,889
  - Density: 2,696/km^{2} (6,983/sq mi)
- Time zone: UTC-5 (PET)
- UBIGEO: 110106

Parcona District is one of fourteen districts of the province Ica in Peru. Parcona is the second smallest of the fourteen districts.

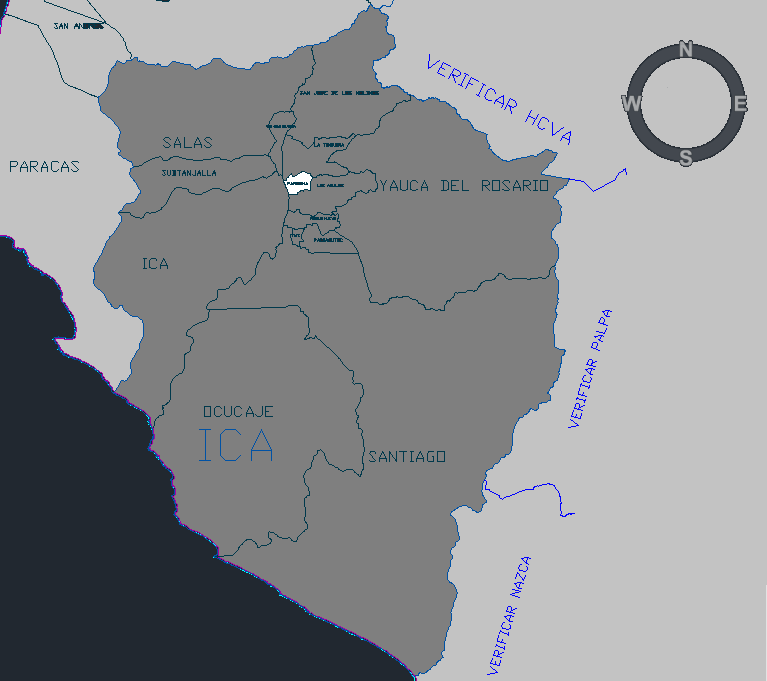
Parcona district within Ica Province of Ica Region Peru.

Parcona is an inland small area, 2.5 km from the Ica District and inhabits 8,000 people.
