= Nasca province =

Coordinates: 14°49′44″S 74°56′37″W

Nazca
- Province
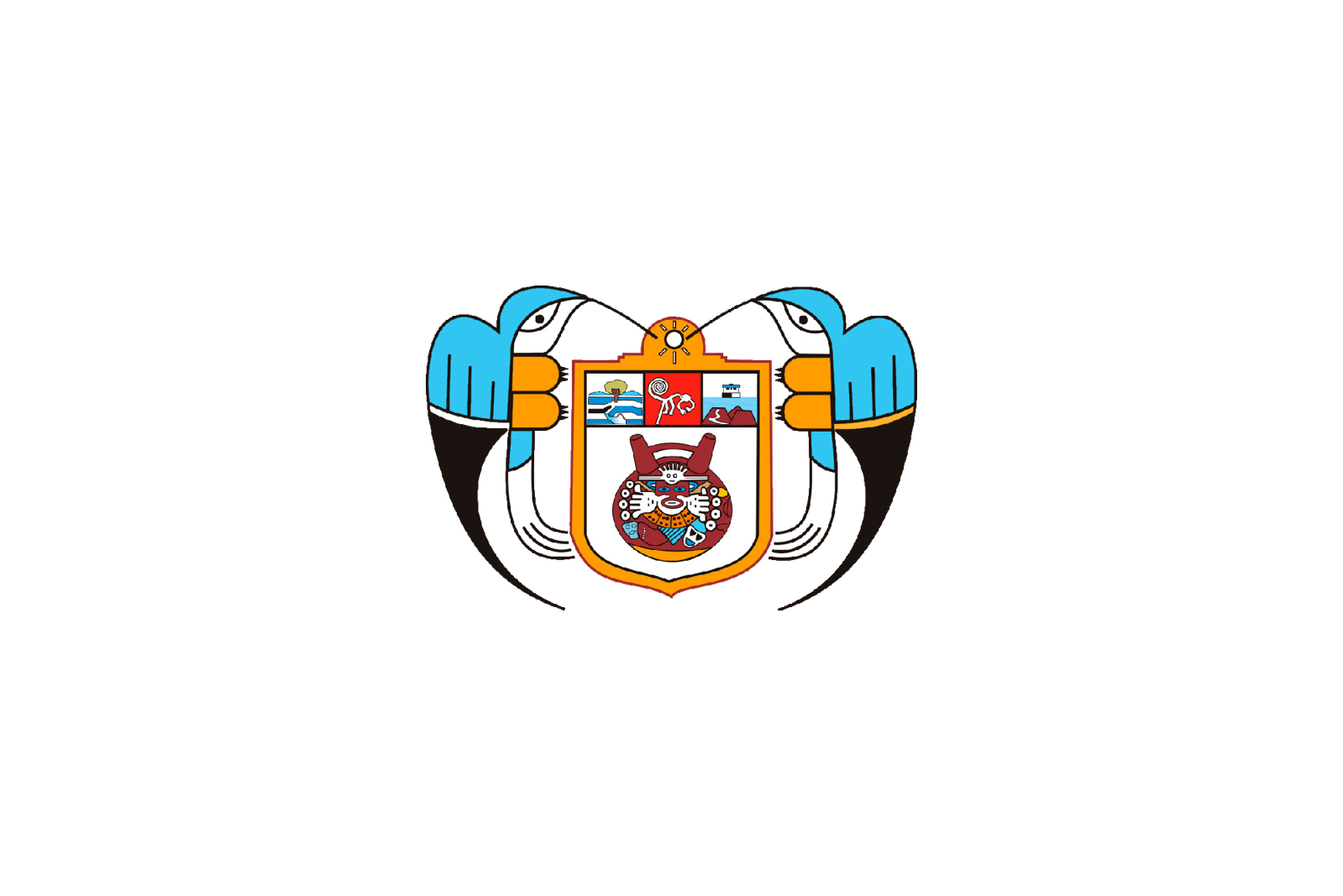
- Flag

- Location of Nazca in the Ica Region
- Country: Peru
- Region: Ica
- Founded: January 23, 1941
- Capital: Nasca

Government
  - Mayor: Julio Oscar Elías Lucana (2019-2022)

Area
  - Total: 5,234.24 km^{2} (2,020.95 sq mi)

Population
  - Total: 69,157
  - Density: 13.212/km^{2} (34.220/sq mi)
- UBIGEO: 1103

Nazca is one of five provinces of the Ica Region of Peru. The capital of the province is the city of Nasca.

== Political division ==
The province of Nazca is divided into five districts (Spanish: distritos, singular: distrito), each of which is headed by a mayor (alcalde):

=== Districts ===
- Changuillo
- El Ingenio
- Marcona
- Nazca
- Vista Alegre

== Culture ==
The province is the birthplace of the Nazca culture. The province is also famous with the Nazca lines, located in the Nazca Desert in southern Peru.

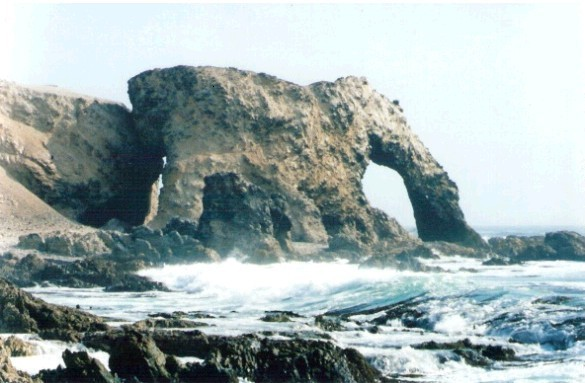
Elephant Rock on the coast of the province of Nazca

== See also ==
- Administrative divisions of Peru
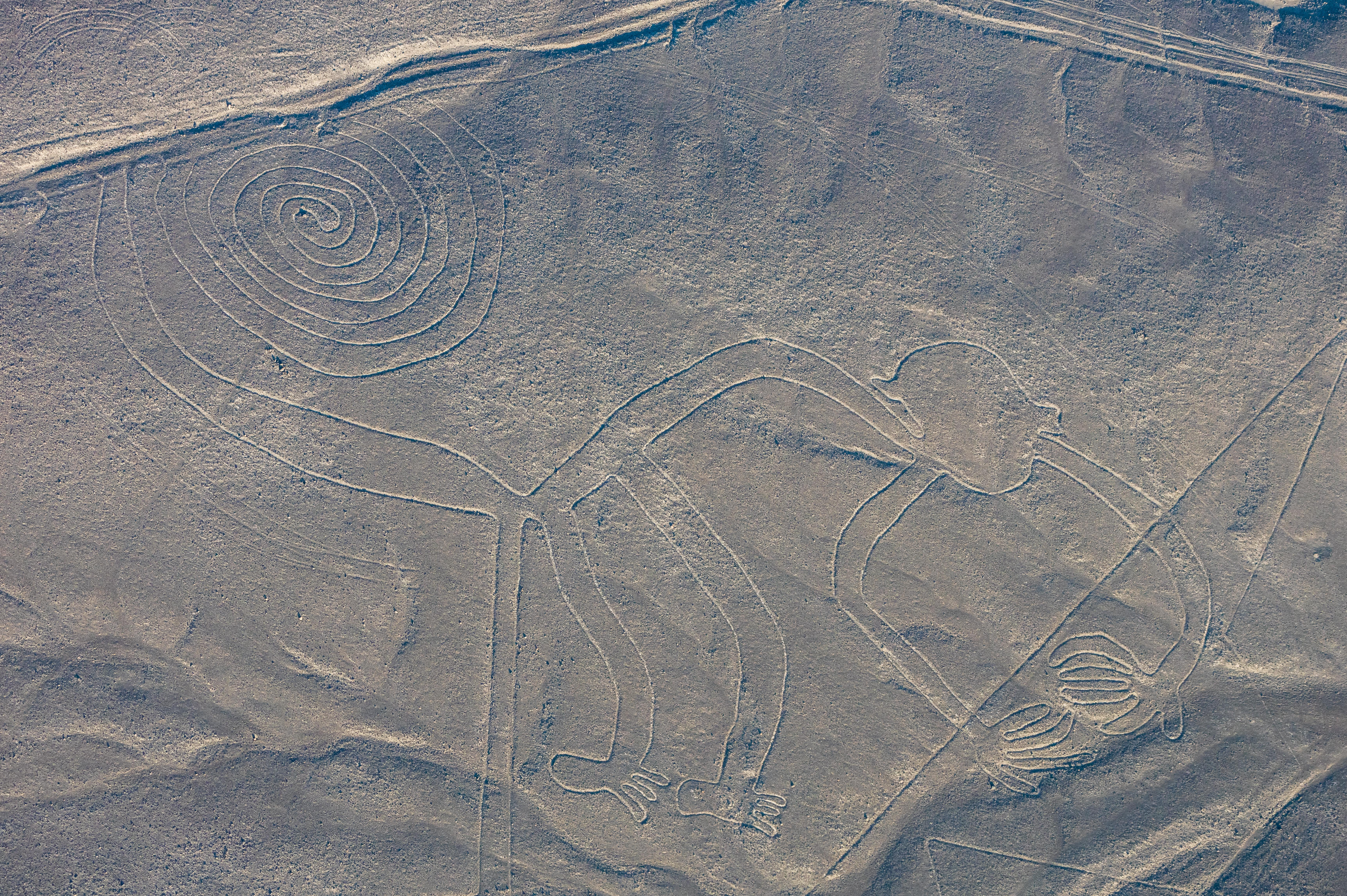
  Aerial photograph of one of the Nazca lines, taken in July 2015, that shows the design known as "The monkey"
