= Nazca District =

Coordinates: 14°49′58″S 74°56′10″W

Nazca
- District
- Interactive map of Nazca
- Country: Peru
- Region: Ica
- Province: Nazca
- Capital: Nazca

Government
  - Mayor: Julio Oscar Elías Lucana (2019-2022)

Area
  - Total: 1,252.25 km^{2} (483.50 sq mi)
- Elevation: 588 m (1,929 ft)

Population (2017)
  - Total: 27,632
  - Density: 22.066/km^{2} (57.150/sq mi)
- Time zone: UTC-5 (PET)
- UBIGEO: 110301

Nazca District is one of five districts of the province Nazca in Peru.

== See also ==
- Administrative divisions of Peru
