= Ica District =

Coordinates: 14.0640°S 75.7291°W

Ica
- District
- Flag Coat of arms
- Interactive map of Ica
- Country: Peru
- Region: Ica
- Province: Ica
- Capital: Ica

Government
  - Mayor: Emma Luisa Mejía Venegas (2019-2022)

Area
  - Total: 887.51 km^{2} (342.67 sq mi)
- Elevation: 406 m (1,332 ft)

Population (2005 census)
  - Total: 117,839
  - Density: 132.77/km^{2} (343.89/sq mi)
- Time zone: UTC-5 (PET)
- UBIGEO: 110101

Ica District is one of fourteen districts of the province of Ica in region of Ica within Peru.

The Province capital city of Ica is located in this district. Ica is also the capital of the entire Region of Ica. Also, close by is the tourist oasis village of Huacachina.

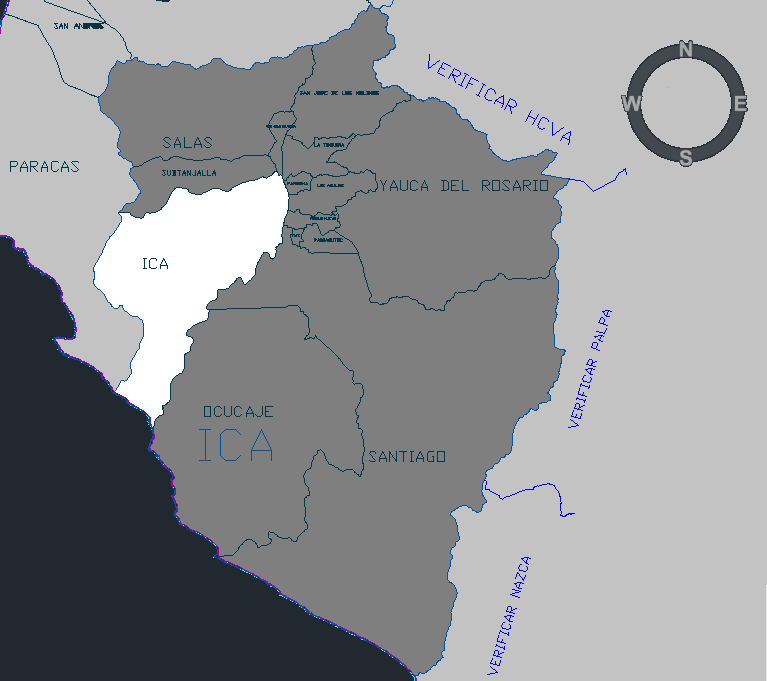
Ica District within Ica Province within Ica Region of Peru

== See also ==
- Administrative divisions of Peru
