= Chincha =

Chincha (Quechua chincha, chinchay north, northern, ocelot) may refer to:

== Locations ==
- Chincha Alta, a city in Peru
- Chincha Islands, a group of islands off the coast of Peru
- Chincha Province, one of five provinces of the Ica Region of Peru
  - Chincha Alta District, one of eleven districts of Chincha province
  - Chincha Baja District, one of eleven districts of Chincha province
- Chinchay Suyu, a region of the Inca Empire
- Chinchayqucha, a lake in central Peru

== Other ==
- Chincha culture, a pre-Columbian ethnic group in Peru
- Chincha Islands War, fought between Spain and Peru in 1864-1866
- Chinchilla
