= Peruvian resistance movement in the War of the Pacific =

Peruvian Republic República Peruana (Spanish)
- 1881–1883
- Flag Coat of arms

- Status: Partially recognised resistance movement (1881–1883); Partially recognized provisional government (1882–1883)
- Capital: Lima (de jure); Undefined (Note: After the fall of Lima, President Nicolás de Piérola declared that the capital was his current location, with Huamanga serving as a de facto capital after De Piérola's establishment in the city.) (1881); Arequipa (1882–1883)
- President
  - 1881: Nicolás de Piérola
  - 1881–1883: Lizardo Montero
- History
  - Established: 12 March 1881
  - Montero reaches Arequipa: 31 August 1882
  - Regenerator Government: 1 January 1883
  - Cáceres defeated: 10 July 1883
  - Treaty of Ancón: 20 October 1883
  - Montero leaves Arequipa: 27 October 1883
Preceded by	Succeeded by
Chilean occupation	Regenerator Government

Peruvian resistance movement
- Resistencia del Perú
- Flag of Peru during the resistance against the Chilean occupation
- Leaders: Andrés Avelino Cáceres; Lizardo Montero; Pedro Silva Gil †; Leoncio Prado (executed); Gregorio Albarracín †; Manuel Villavicencio; Aurelio García y García; Luis Germán Astete †
- Dates active: 1880–1885
- Allegiance: Peru
- Active regions: (Peru) Peruvian territories free or under Chilean occupation
- Ideology: Anti-Chilean sentiment Anti-Chinese sentiment Anti-imperialism; Peruvian nationalism Peruvian irredentism
- Size: 300–500 (in 1880); 2,000–4,000 (in 1881); 5,500–6,000 (in 1882–1883); 670–3,000 (in 1884–1885)
- Wars: War of the Pacific: Tacna and Arica campaign; Lima campaign; Breña campaign; Sixth Peruvian Civil War: Arequipa uprising (1884); Huancayo offensive; Battle of Jauja (1885); Battle of Lima (1885)

The Peruvian resistance movement was composed of the Peruvian militias and guerrillas commanded by local, civilian or military leaders, who confronted the Chilean Army and Navy during the period of occupation that took place during the War of the Pacific.

Despite not having an official founding date, the movement began to function after the occupation of Lima, reaching its peak during the Breña campaign. The resistance was the joint formation of Peruvian montonera forces and troops of the Peruvian Army at the service of Nicolás de Piérola, Andrés Avelino Cáceres and Justiniano Borgoño Castañeda. Miguel Iglesias and his army, as well as the occupation forces of Patricio Lynch and the Chilean Army and Navy in general were the resistance's main enemies.

== Background ==
On 5 April 1879, a state of war was officially declared between Peru and Chile, starting military confrontations between both states. As a result, the Chilean navy carried out a successful naval campaign against Peru, which guaranteed her control over the seas., as well as a successful land campaign, starting with an offensive in Tarapacá and other regions in southern Peru, with a successful campaign into Lima that reached the city by early 1881. As a result of this campaign, the Chileans established a collaborationist government headed by Francisco García Calderón with the intention of signing a peace treaty in their favor.

== Resistance ==
The resistance was nominally in charge of Nicolás de Piérola, who had been President of Peru since 1879, establishing himself in Ayacucho, with figures such as Andrés Avelino Cáceres and Lizardo Montero joining his cause. Despite this, different uncoordinated uprisings also took place in the vicinities of Lima and the Peruvian coast.

=== Chincha and Cañete ===
After Manuel Villavicencio's collaborationist troops occupied Chincha in December 1881. Peruvian troops headed by Pedro Mas and Manuel de Erice took Chincha Baja on 6 January 1882. Manuel de Erice, sent by Mas, attempted to negotiate with Villavicencio that both factions join against the common enemy. After Villavicencio's refusal, Erice's troops occupied Chincha on 7 January, starting a massive fire in the town, which was followed by the looting of the warehouses owned by foreign locals around midnight. Erice's troops had been joined by men from Sunampe under the command of Andrés "Picuy" Pachas Hernández and Andrés Pacheco, who had been fighting since 1880. Villavicencia himself retreated along with some Italians to Pisco.

A second expedition supported by Leoncio Tagle was sent to "pacify" Chincha and Pisco on 28 and 29 January, occupying Tambo de Mora and Chincha Alta, as well as the cities of Laran, San Jose and San Regis. The local resistance continued nevertheless under the command of Pachas, who was caught by Chilean troops in late 1882 and executed on 25 December. Despite this setback, the resistance continued until the end of the war.

=== Huamanga ===
After first establishing himself in Jauja, Nicolás de Piérola settled in Huamanga. By this point the city served as the de facto capital, as he had declared that the capital of Peru was his current location. De Piérola convened the National Assembly of Ayacucho, which was installed on 28 July 1881, before which he resigned from the dictatorship. The Assembly, however, invested him with the title of Provisional President and issued a Statute, also provisional, on 29 July. Aurelio García y García was also appointed as general minister. In October, Piérola formed his ministerial cabinet, in which Cáceres was listed as Minister of War, but this cabinet never met. As a result of this assembly, a new government, parallel to that of La Magdalena, was established.

Piérola proposed to continue the war against Chile and suggested reviving the Peru-Bolivian Confederation to attack the Chileans, travelling to Bolivia to coordinate said plan with Bolivian President Narciso Campero. The plan evolved into the unrealized Peru–Bolivian United States. Successive pronouncements made in Arequipa, Cajamarca and Chosica eventually forced him to resign from the presidency on 28 November 1881, being succeeded by Lizardo Montero. Afterwards, he left for Europe, unsuccessfully attempting to convince the British and French to act as mediators for Peru, returning to Lima after the signing of the Treaty of Ancón in 1883.

=== Arequipa ===
Lizardo Montero Flores, who had been appointed as Vice President of Peru by Francisco García Calderón prior to his deportation to Valparaíso, assumed the presidency of the Chilean-recognized government while in Cajamarca. He moved to Huaraz in June 1882, and left for Arequipa the same year, also refusing to accept the Chilean terms for a peace treaty, which included the transfer of territory in southern Peru.

Before Montero's departure from Cajamarca, he appointed Miguel Iglesias as Military Chief of the North, who proclaimed the Cry of Montán, a manifesto demanding peace with Chile even at the cost of losing territory, on 31 August, the same day Montero entered Arequipa. Montero refused to recognize Iglesias' manifesto, and established a parallel government that established itself in Arequipa as a provisional capital for the duration of its occupation, with the city receiving the name Independent Republic of Arequipa (Spanish: República Independiente de Arequipa), which appeared on passports issued at the time. Montero's government ratified García Calderón, by then in Chile, as the de jure constitutional president of Peru, with Montero serving as first vice president and later proclaiming Cáceres as second vice president. This government would collaborate with the resistance while continuing to attempt negotiations with Chile, who recognized Iglesias' government.

Prior to and during this period, Cáceres and his troops, who had been organized to a lesser extent in comparison to Piérola's in Ayacucho, located themselves in central Peru, carrying out their military campaign against Chile. Cáceres had established himself in Chosica after the fall of Lima, later moving to Ayacucho, returning to Izcuchaca in 1882, where a counteroffensive took place against Chilean troops. During this counteroffensive, battles such as that of La Concepción took place, which led to Chilean troops retreating, initially to Tarma and then to La Oroya.

By this point, the occupation forces in the north were also at risk of being surrounded, with Cáceres' army gaining control of the Mantaro Valley by July 1882. Cáceres attempted to pursue the Chilean forces in their retreat, but upon learning that Colonel Máximo Tafur had not destroyed the bridge in La Oroya as he had been ordered to, he returned to Tarma, where on 18 July, Cáceres established his new headquarters. On 27 July, a Chilean platoon was attacked in Tambo de Mora, and two days later, a company in Chincha. By early August 1882, Chilean troops had returned to Lima. Meanwhile, in Cajamarca, the Cacerista troops under the command of Dr. José Mercedes Puga fought against collaborationist Peruvian troops under the command of Lorenzo Iglesias, Miguel Iglesias' brother, on 17 November, who successfully defended the city, forcing Puga and his troops to retreat to nearby Pauca.

On 9 February 1883, Patricio Lynch, head of the occupation forces, received an order from Chilean President Domingo Santa María to reinforce the command of Miguel Iglesias in the north, convinced that with Iglesias he could sign peace according to his interests, and that Montero and García Calderón would not accept any territorial transfer. By this point Cáceres and his resistance proved popular among Peruvians, receiving support from the government in Arequipa, the Catholic Church, and even Bolivia. Despite this support, Cáceres would be eventually defeated at the Battle of Huamachuco on 10 July 1883, and, as a result, discussions took place among members of the government at Arequipa. In late 1883, amid civil discontent at the news of the imminent occupation by Chilean troops, Montero left Arequipa for Puno to avoid its destruction, with the city being occupied on 29 October. By the time he reached Lake Titicaca, he put Cáceres in charge of the powerless government, who did not exercise power in the end, later recognizing the Treaty of Ancón. After this action, Montero left for Buenos Aires and later Europe.

== Foreign relations ==
With the governance of Peru split between a Chilean administration in Lima and the rest of the Peruvian coast, a collaborationist government in La Magdalena and later Cajamarca, and De Piérola's partially organized resistance in Ayacucho, later joined by another collaborationist government turned parallel government in Arequipa, different countries took different attitudes regarding who to recognize as the legitimate government of Peru.

- Argentine diplomat José E. Uriburu declared that Argentina would "abstain from acting."
- (Bolivia) The Bolivian Foreign Ministry refrained from sending diplomats to Lima "until the uncertainty about the true representative of Peru was cleared up." After Montero's government established itself in Arequipa, Campero's government recognized it as legitimate, and assisted the government and the Cáceres' rebel troops with armament bought from Europe and the United States.
- Costa Rica recognized and established relations with the Magdalena-based government. Before the occupation of Lima, Costa Rica had sent weapons to the port of Callao, which had been denounced by Chile in 1879, as Costa Rica had declared itself neutral, but was only proven in 1881, leading to a diplomatic incident between both states.
- The Kingdom of Denmark recognized and established relations with the Magdalena-based government.
- El Salvador recognized and established relations with the Magdalena-based government.
- Honduras recognized and established relations with the Magdalena-based government.
- Nicaragua recognized and established relations with the Magdalena-based government.
- Uruguay recognized and established relations with the Magdalena-based government.
- After contact was established with Isaac P. Christiancy, Minister Plenipotentiary to Peru until 1881, relations were established between the United States and the government in La Magdalena, with the former offering to act in favor of Peru in the diplomatic aftermath of the conflict to allow the latter to maintain its territorial integrity, as long as it was possible to pay compensation to the occupying power. By 1882, however, American mediation in the conflict turned less in favor of Peru and more in favor of Chile in the aftermath of the assassination of President James A. Garfield.
- Switzerland recognized and established relations with the Magdalena-based government.
- (Venezuela) Venezuelan president Antonio Guzmán Blanco condemned the Chilean invasion and recognized the Ayacucho-based government in 1881.

== See also ==
- Restoration Army of Peru and United Restoration Army, of the War of the Confederation
- Peruvian Republic (1838–1839), from the same conflict
- Peruvian Civil War
