= Chavin =

Chavin may refer to:

== Places ==
- Chavín de Huantar, an archaeological site in Peru built by the Chavín culture
- Chavín District, Chincha, Peru
- Chavín de Huantar District, Huari, Peru
- Chavín de Pariarca District, Huamalies, Peru
- Chavin, Indre, a commune of the Indre département in France
- Chavin, Iran, a village in Kurdistan Province, Iran
- The Chavín parish belonging to the municipality of Viveiro, Spain

== Other uses ==
- Chinga Chavin, U.S. musician
- Chavín culture, an early culture of the Andean region, pre-dating the Moche culture in Peru
- Operation Chavín de Huántar, a Peruvian military operation that ended the 1997 Japanese embassy hostage crisis
- Rhinella chavin (R. chavin), a species of toad
