= Partido Nacional =

Partido Nacional is Spanish for "National Party". Used as a proper noun without any other adjectives, it may refer to:

- National Party (Chile, 1857–1933)
- National Party (Chile, 1966–1973)
- National Party of Honduras
- National Party (Peru)
- National Party (Uruguay)
