= La Centinela =

Archaeological site in Peru

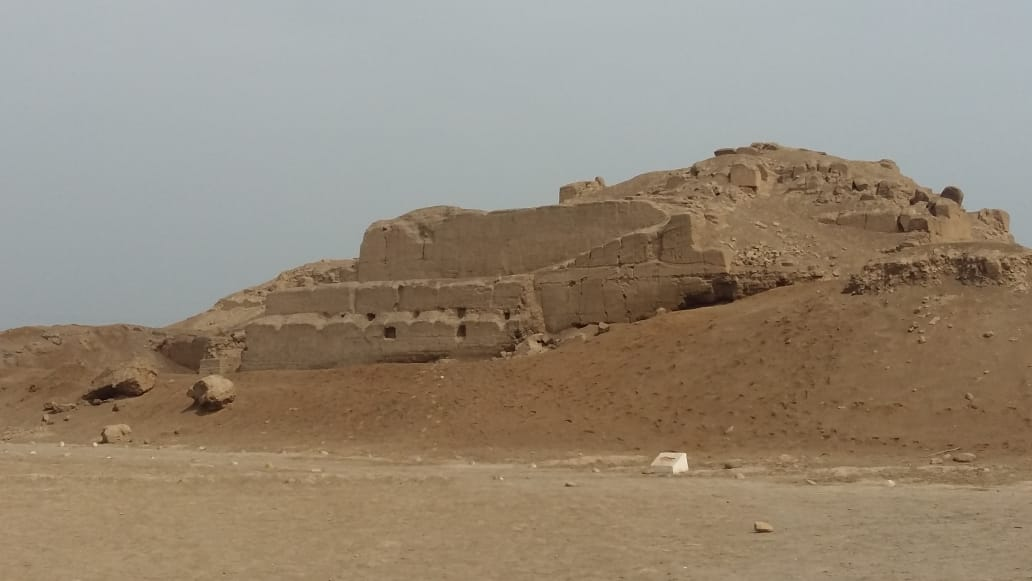
- Interactive map of La Centinela
- 13°27′1″S 76°10′16″W
- Location: Peru
- Region: Ica Region

La Centinela is an archaeological site in Peru which was an active administrative center during both the Inca and pre-Inca periods.

== History ==
La Centinela was the Incan capital of the kingdom of the Chincha. It is "an unusual site in that it is one of the very few places where the Incas incorporated a major state installation into a preexisting, and still functioning, non-Inca capital." In 1958, Dwight T. Wallace discovered a system of straight roads emanating from La Centinela, suggesting a highly centralized pre-Incan administration.

== Site ==
La Centinela lies about 200 km south of Lima in the Chincha Valley and about 1 km away from the Pacific Ocean and is surrounded by irrigated agricultural land. This means that the residents of La Centinela exploited plant, animal and marine resources.

There are 11 well-defined pyramid structures and minor buildings constructed by adobe bricks. There are examples of adobe walls decorated using the technique of Champlevé.

A black and red on white geometric painting can be found within the principal Inca building.
