= Chincha Alta District =

Coordinates: 13.4159°S 76.1296°W

Chincha Alta
- District
- Interactive map of Chincha Alta
- Country: Peru
- Region: Ica
- Province: Chincha
- Founded: January 2, 1857
- Capital: Chincha Alta

Government
  - Mayor: Armando Huamán Tasayco (2019-2022)

Area
  - Total: 238.34 km^{2} (92.02 sq mi)
- Elevation: 97 m (318 ft)

Population (2005 census)
  - Total: 62,609
  - Density: 262.69/km^{2} (680.36/sq mi)
- Time zone: UTC-5 (PET)
- UBIGEO: 110201

Chincha Alta District is one of eleven districts of the province Chincha in Peru.

One of its iconic sites is the Manor House known as Hacienda San José.

Mayor: Armando Huamán Tasayco (2019-2022)

== See also ==
- Administrative divisions of Peru
