= Pueblo Nuevo District, Chincha =

Coordinates: 13.4048°S 76.1270°W

Pueblo Nuevo
- District
- Interactive map of Pueblo Nuevo
- Country: Peru
- Region: Ica
- Province: Chincha
- Founded: January 29, 1965
- Capital: Pueblo Nuevo

Government
  - Mayor: Lucio Juarez Ochoa

Area
  - Total: 209.45 km^{2} (80.87 sq mi)
- Elevation: 149 m (489 ft)

Population (2005 census)
  - Total: 47,150
  - Density: 225.1/km^{2} (583.0/sq mi)
- Time zone: UTC-5 (PET)
- UBIGEO: 110207

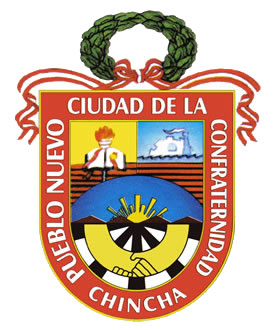

Pueblo Nuevo District is one of the eleven districts of the Chincha Province in Peru.

From the hierarchical point of view of the Catholic Church, it is part of the Diocese of Ica.

The Pueblo Nuevo district is one of the eleven districts that make up the province of Chincha in the department of Ica, under the administration of the regional government of Ica.
