= Tambo Colorado =

Archaeological site in Peru

- Puka Tampu
- Pukallaqta, Pukawasi
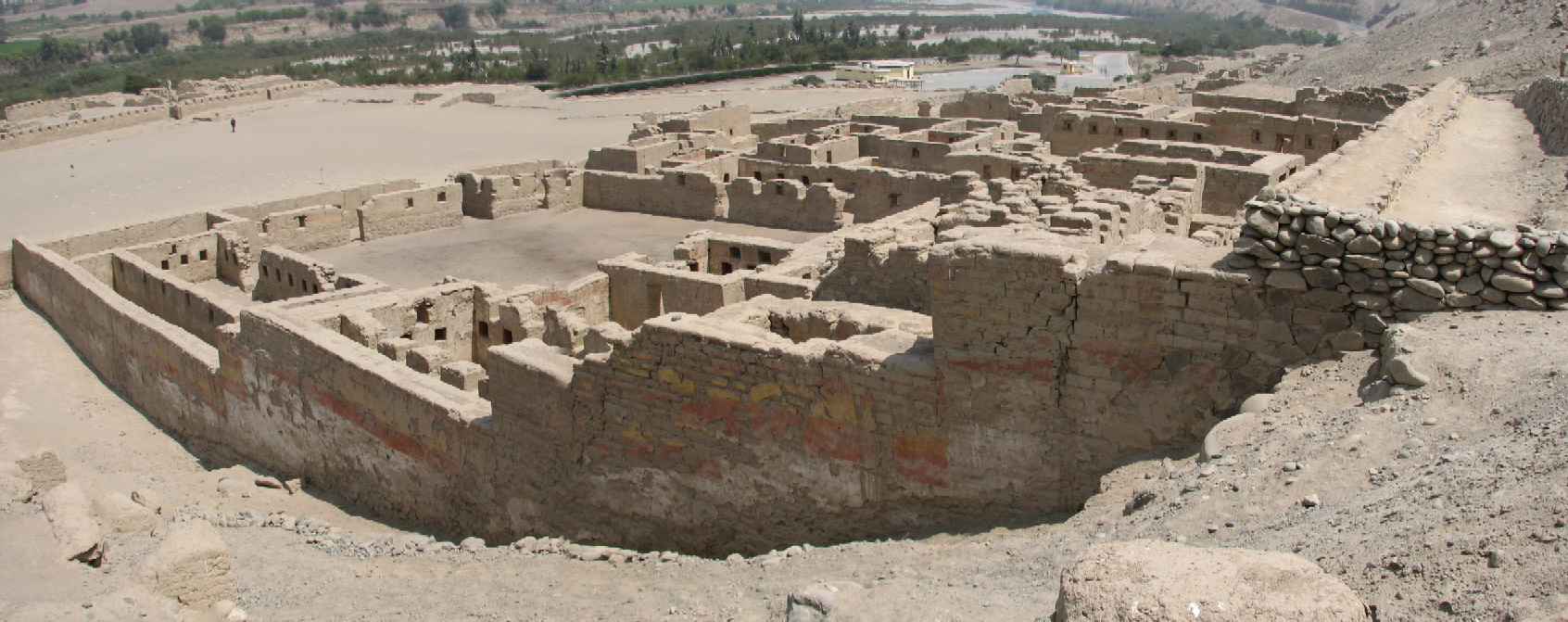
- Remains of original colours on the Northern Palace adobe walls of Tambo Colorado

- Location within Peru
- 13°42′19″S 75°49′45″W
- Type: Settlement
- Periods: Late Horizon
- Cultures: Inca
- Location: Ica Region, Peru

History
- Built: 1470
- Abandoned: 1532

Site notes
- Area: 1.2 ha (3.0 acres)

Tambo Colorado (Quechua: Pukatampu) is a well-preserved Inca adobe complex near the coast of Peru, also known under the Quechua names Puka Tampu ("red resting place"), Pukallaqta ("red place") or Pukawasi ("red house").

== Location ==
The site is located just inland from the south coast of Perú in the Pisco River Valley about 40 km along the highway to Ayacucho known as the Via de los Libertadores, close to the town of Pisco. Initial reports from the 2007 Peru earthquake reported no major damage to the site.

A High resolution GPS point was shot at the site datum on 2 Aug 2009 using an L2 GPS (Trimble GeoXH with Zephyr). The post-processed position is as follows: Northings: 8484705.386 m (± 0.8 m) Eastings: 410335.884 m (± 0.8 m) Altitude (MSL): 484.849 m (±1.8 m) UTM Zone 18 South, Datum WGS 1984.

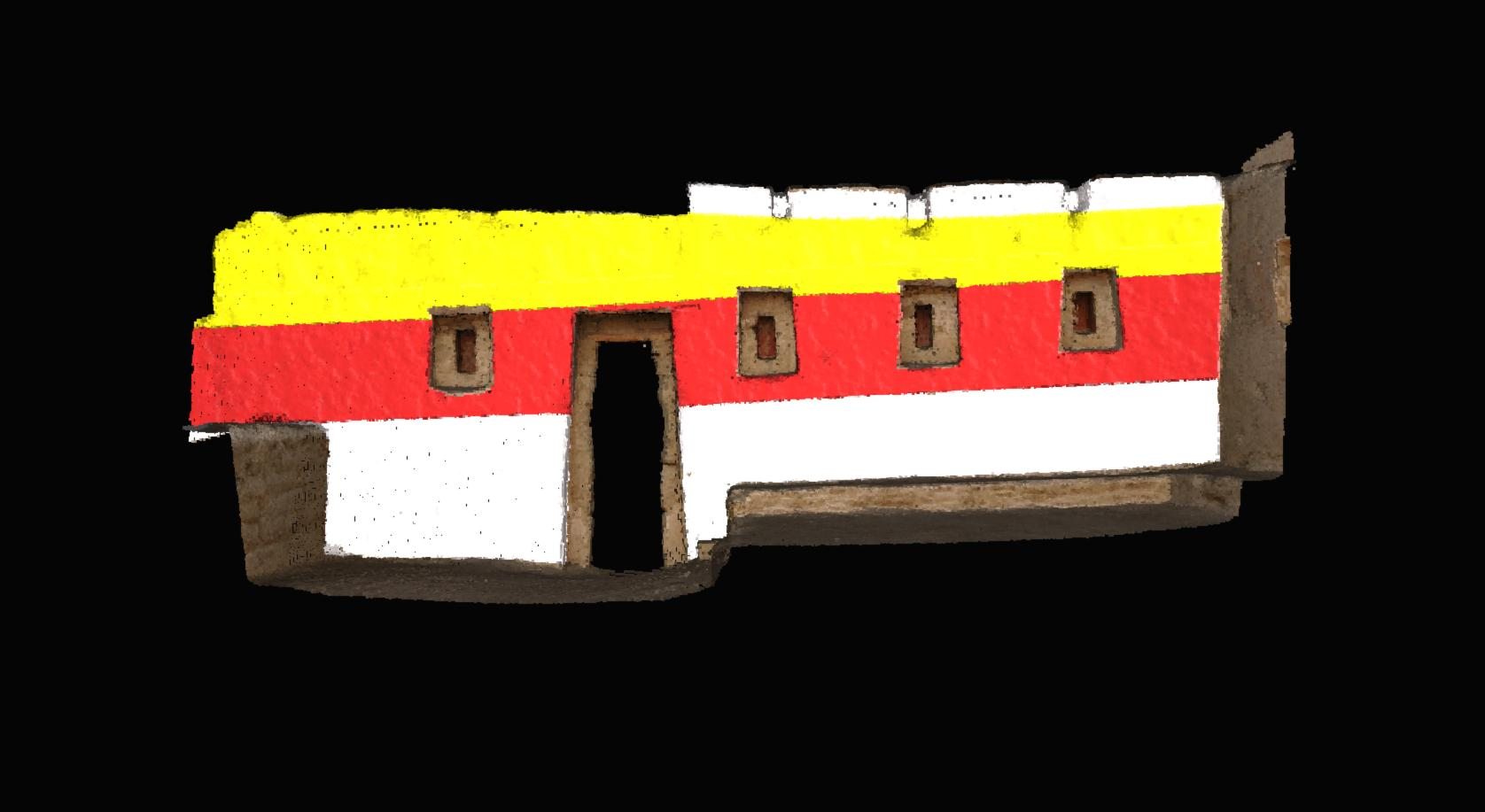
Digital reconstruction of original Inca painting on Room 42 wall, Tambo Colorado. Data is derived from a CyArk/University of California research partnership.

== History ==
The site was most likely built at the end of the 15th century during the reign of the Inca king Pachacuti Inca Yupanqui also known as Pachacutec, after the annexation of the merchant kingdom of Chincha.

== Name ==
The site owes its name to the abundant use of colors on the walls. Thanks to favorable (very dry) environmental conditions, many walls at Tambo, both internal and external, retain enough residual colored paint to accurately reconstruct what the original wall painting would have been like. Color here was often applied in horizontal strips of red, black, white, and yellow ochre atop stucco, and variation in color would accentuate architectural features such as niches. Trapezoidal niches at Tambo have one or two recesses each, likely used for the placement of important objects. As with all Inca constructions, the overall dimensions of niche construction are standardized across the entire site.

== Lay-out ==
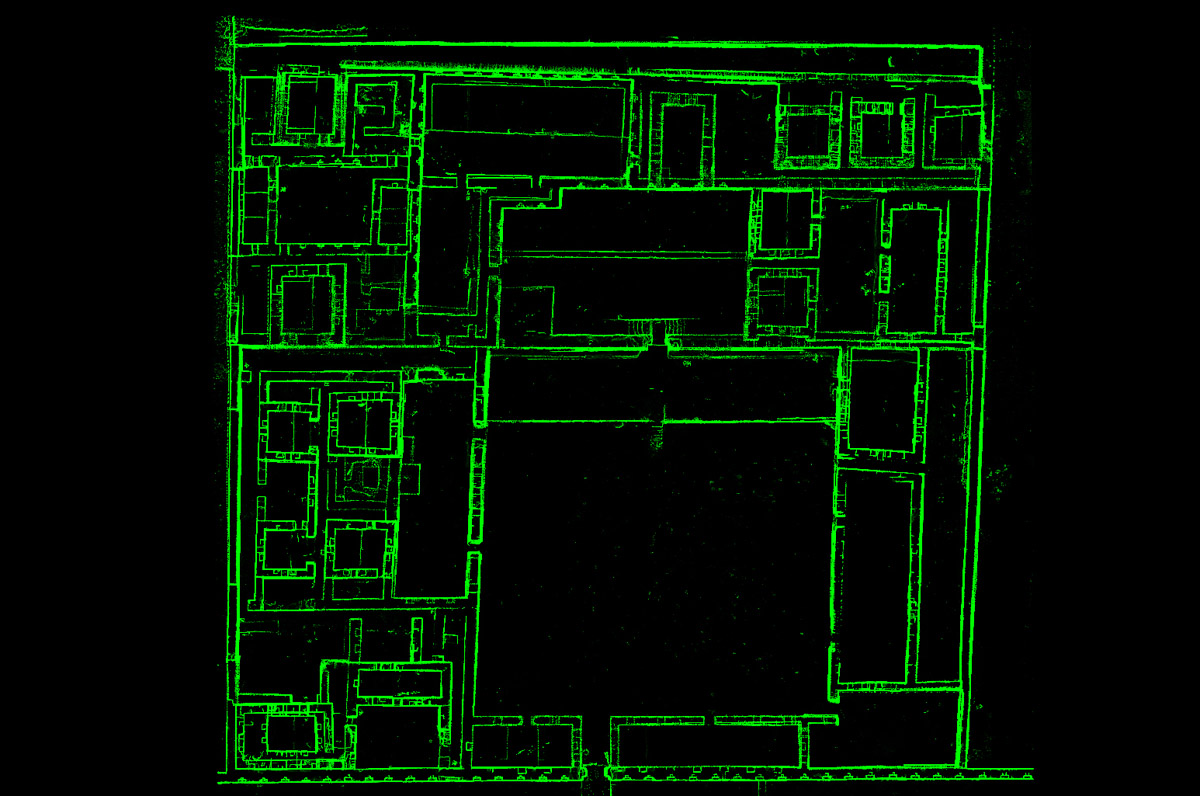
Plan of Northern Palace, Tambo Colorado, cut from a Laser Scan. Data is derived from a CyArk/University of California research partnership

The site consists of several structures around a large central plaza. The central plaza is shaped like a trapezoid with its largest side being 150 m long. The main structures are grouped together in a northern part and a southern part (Sector Norte and Sector Sur). These structures are known as the Northern palace and the two Southern Palaces, flanked by an Ushnu (raised ceremonial platform) and a building known as the Utilities Structure.

The combination of Chincha and Inca architectural techniques can be seen in the place.

== Use ==
It is believed to have been used by the Incas as an administrative and control site on the main road from the coast to the highlands.

== Museum ==
A small on-site museum is located near the entrance of the complex.

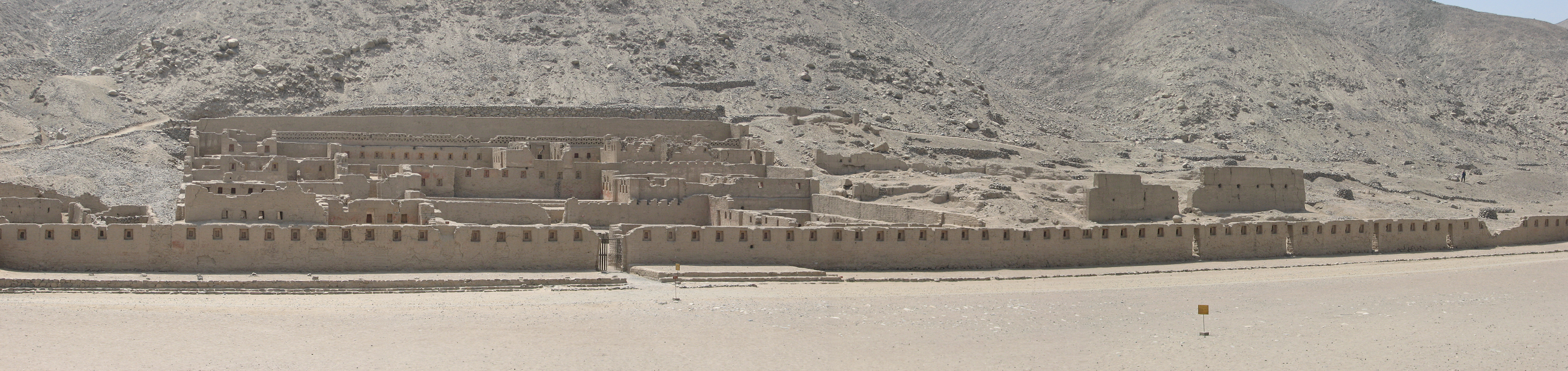
A panorama of Tambo Colorado
