= Hacienda San José (hotel) =

Coordinates: 13°31′S 76°04′W

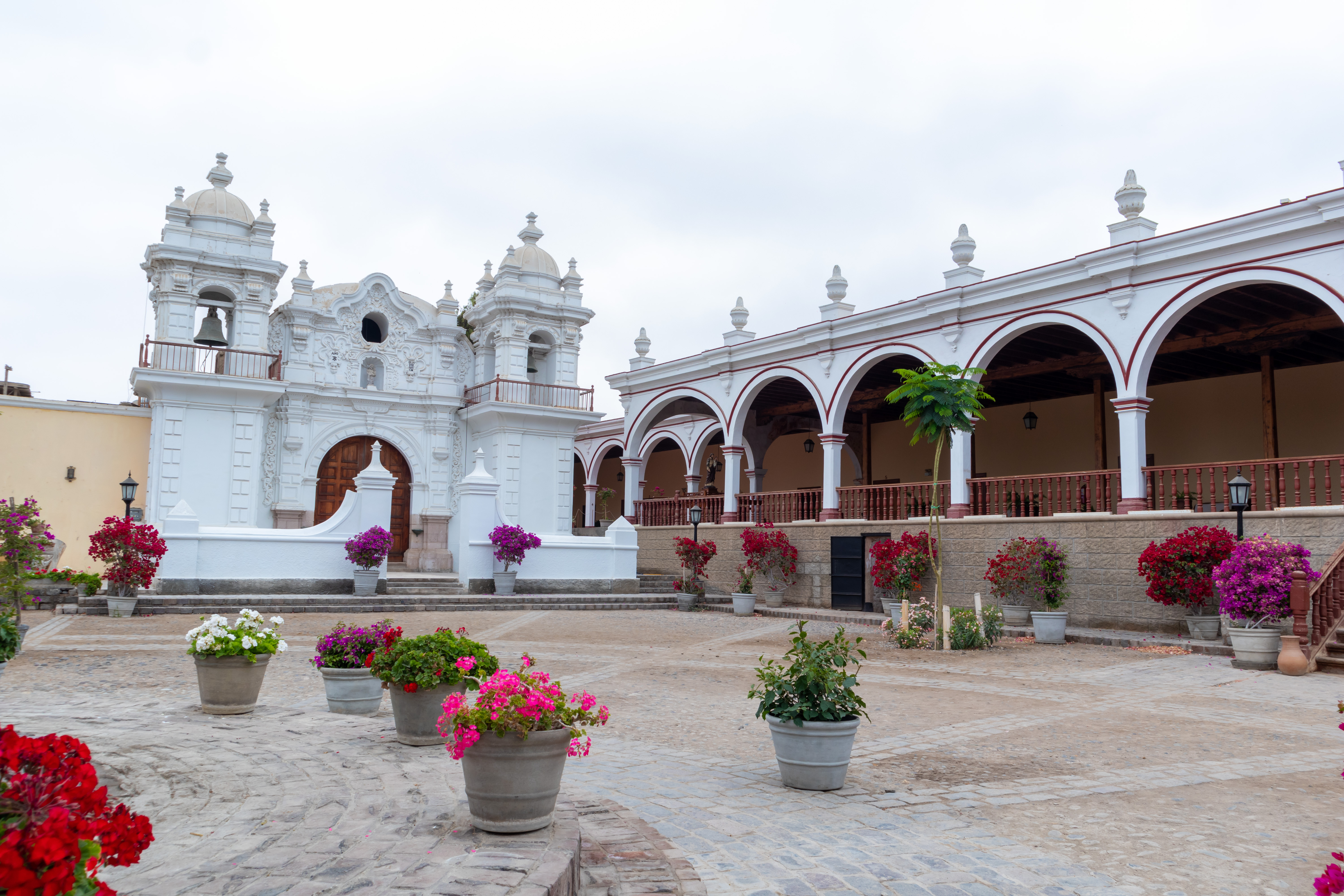
Entrance to the Hacienda, Jesuit Church to the left

The Hacienda San José is located in the District of El Carmen, in the Province of Chincha, in the Region of Ica, Peru. During a period, this manor house had one of the richest plantations in Chincha, with around 1000 slaves working on its fields.

The hacienda suffered great damage after the 2007 Peru earthquake that hit the central Peruvian coast on August 15, 2007. The hotel reopened for guests in 2012.

== History ==
The first news about San José Manor House dates back to 1688 when Rosa Josepha de Muñatones y Aguado married Don Andrés Salazar. As a dowry, she brought into the marriage the Manor House, its church and farmland on the Chincha Valley. It was transformed into a sugar plantation that held 87 black slaves. Sugarcane yielded two of the sweetest and most valued products in those times: sugar and honey.

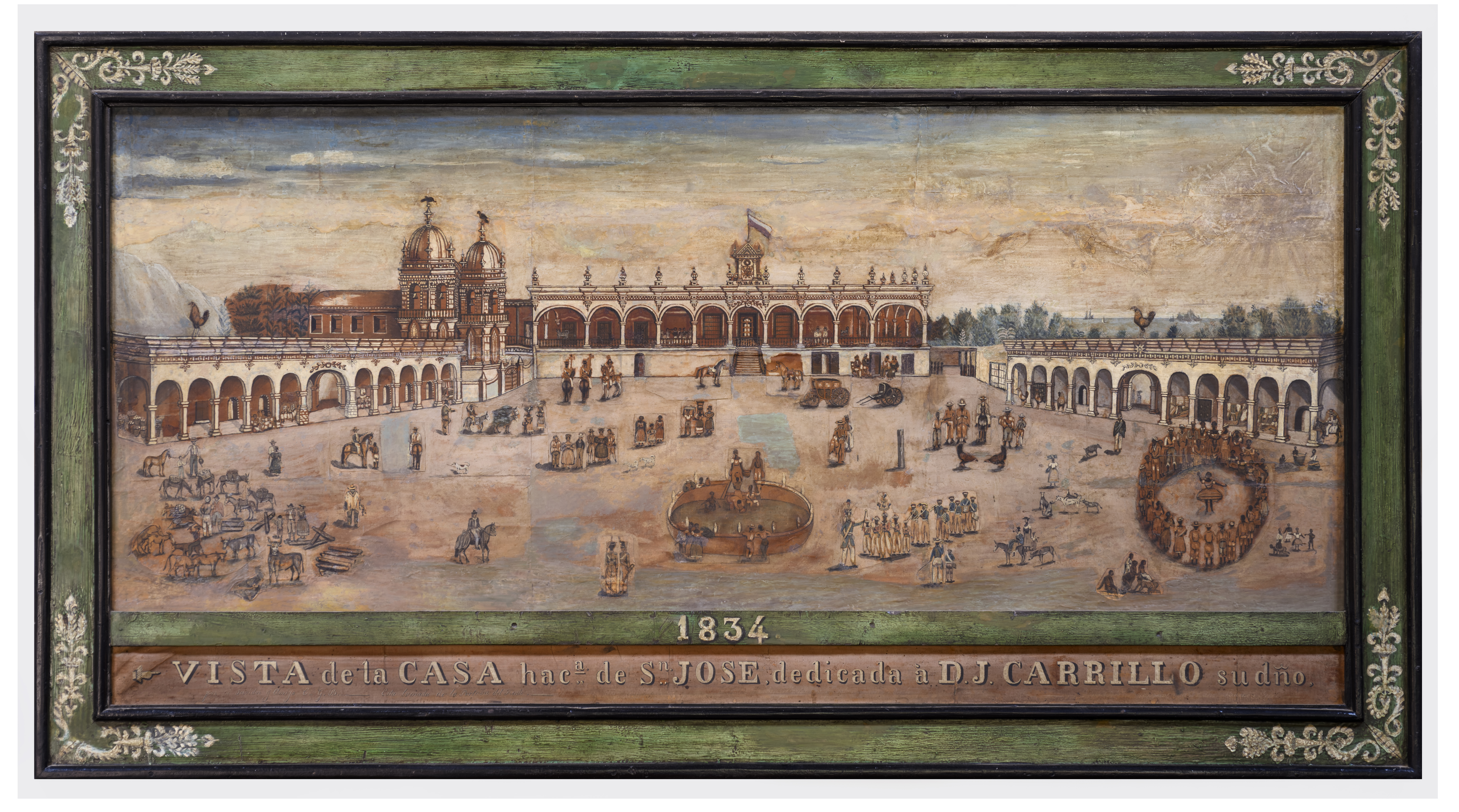
Cuadro original representa la Casa Hacienda San José en 1834

In 1764, a new marriage strengthened the San José Manor House property: the daughter of Don Agustín de Salazar y Muñatones, Rosa Salazar Gaviño, married Don Fernando Carrillo de Albornoz y Bravo Lagunas. They bought San Regis Manor House, which had belonged to the Jesuits. The union of these properties was one of the richest in all of Chincha. Over 1,000 slaves worked the lands producing sugarcane and cotton. El Carmen village dates back to those times (1811), where many slaves used to hide, escaping from the extensive abuse they had on the plantations.

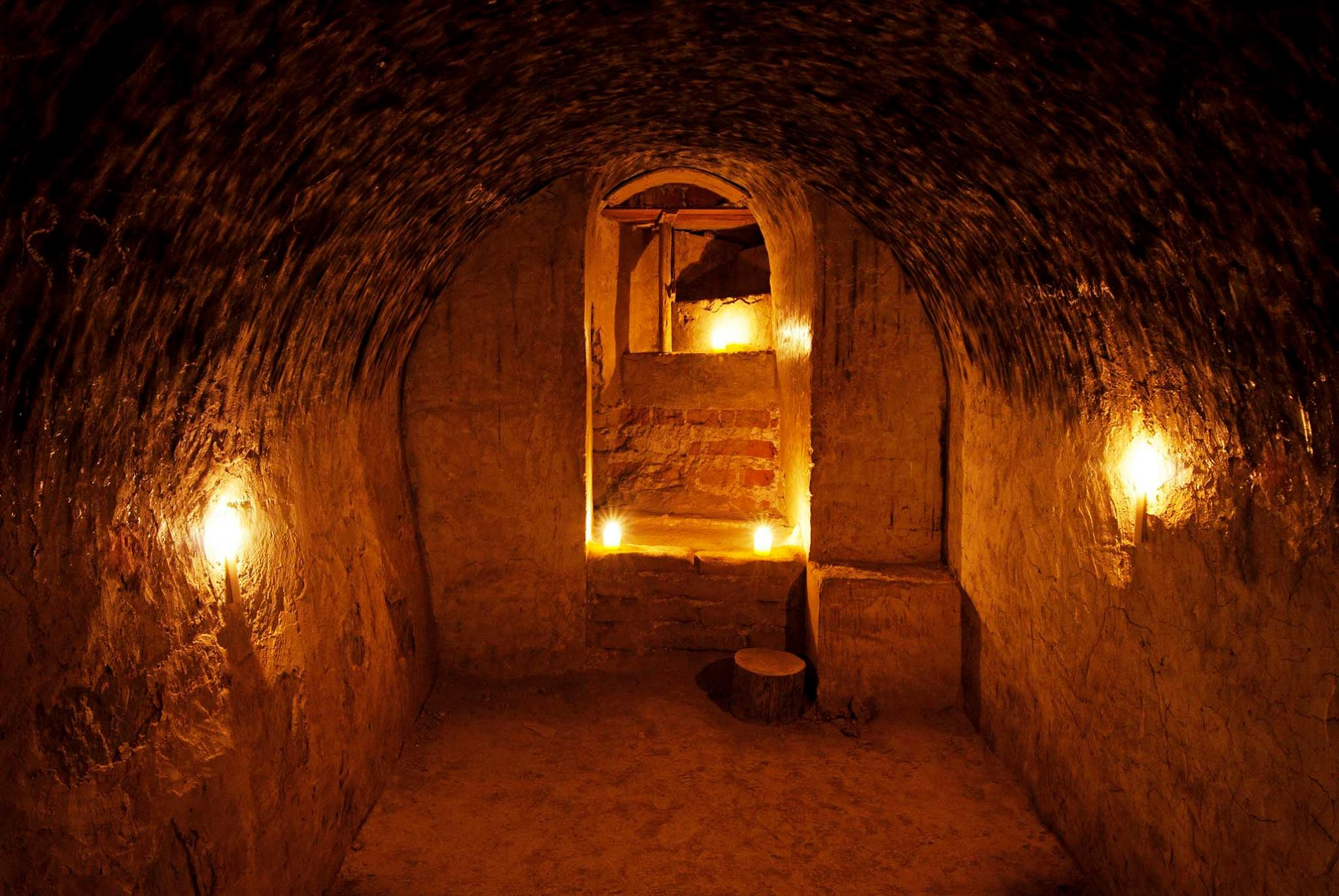
Pasajes subterráneos ubicados dentro de Casa Hacienda San José

=== Problems during the independence movement ===
In 1821, Fernando Carrillo de Albornoz y Salazar, son of Fernando and Rosa's, was the owner of the San José and San Regis manor houses. The Chincha Valley was shocked to see General Don José de San Martin and his troops disembarking at Pisco. Some slaves managed to escape the plantations to join the Libertador's troops, and Fernando Carillo de Albornoz y Salazar fled to Spain with two of his children, abandoning his wife, Petronila Zavala, and his youngest son, José. The Government took possession of the manor house and lands right after the defection; however, Petronila Zavala regained possession of her house in 1827.

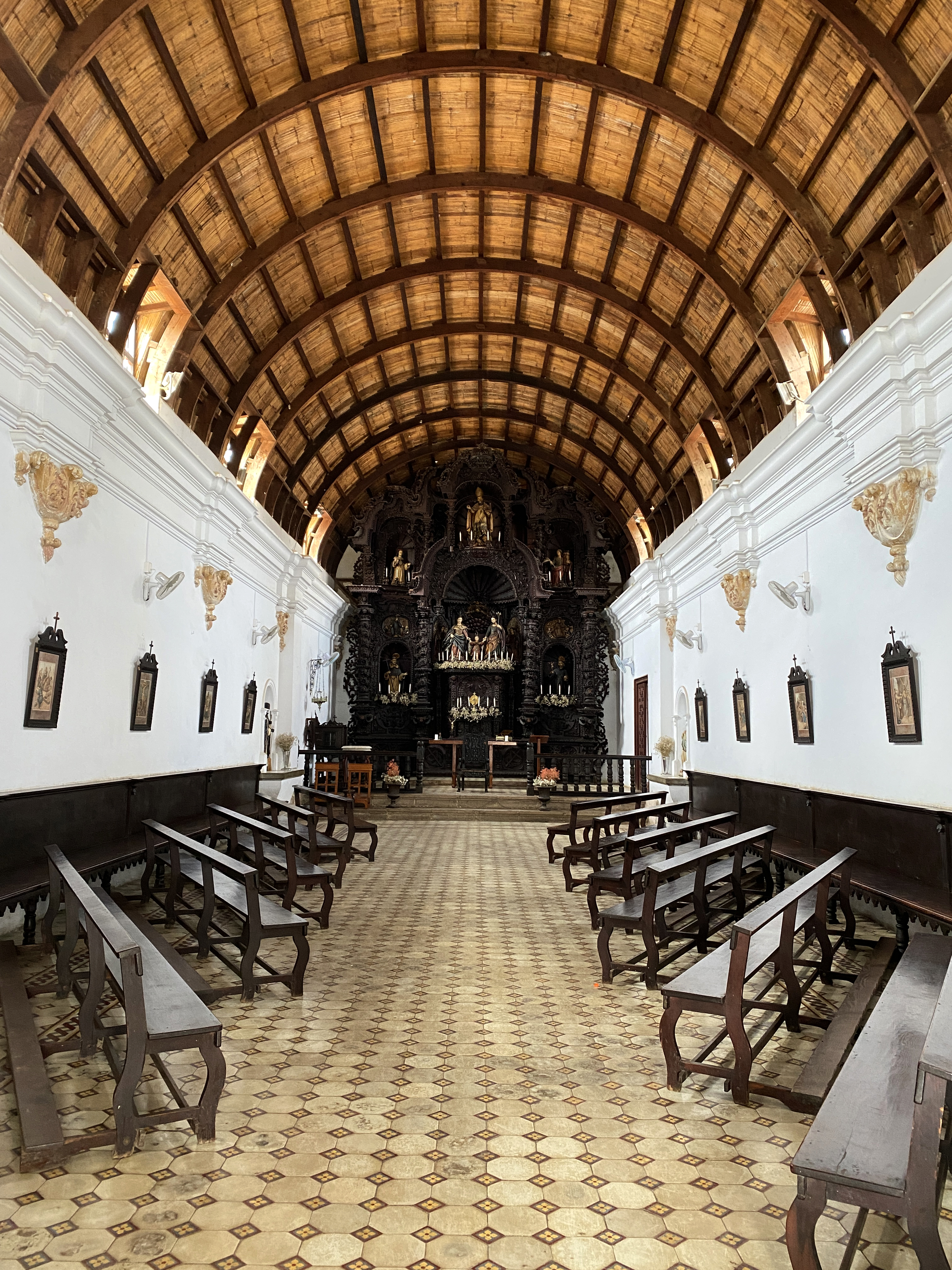
Capilla bárroca del siglo XVII

Eventually, San José Manor House recovered from the hardships of the Independence movement. Slavery was abolished in Peru in 1854; however, a great number of slaves were still working on the plantations. Fernando Carrillo de Albornoz y Zavala, Fernando and Petronila's eldest son, inherited the property and imported a vapor tractor from Europe.

The last heir of Fernando Carrillo de Albornoz y Zavala and Catalina Mendoza, Julio Carrillo de Albornoz y Mendoza (aged 25), was assassinated by slaves on the main staircase of the manor house during the Pacific War. Right after his death in 1879, the house was sold by his widow, Catalina del Valle y Osma, to Roberto B. Leguía, the President's brother. In 1913, the house was sold by the latter to Manuela Eguren, Cilloniz's widow.

=== Present days ===
Manuela Eguren, Cilloniz's widow, and her 12 children lived years of prosperity at the manor house. A cotton gin was built and the cotton was exported to England directly from Tambo the Mora harbor in Chincha. Cattle was also acquired to sell the meat.

In 1960, after the Agrarian Law was passed, during the first mandate of President Fernando Belaunde, the lands were split among Manuela Eguren's children. The lands were acquired by Don Julio Cilloniz Eguren, one of ManueIa's sons, who in turn passed them on to his 4 children: Julio, Augusto. German and Amelia Cilloniz Garfias, each one inheriting 150 ha. In 1968, Augusto died and his widow, Doña Angela Benavides de Cilloniz, bought the Manor House from his brothers-in-law. She remains the owner. In 1970, the manor house was declared a World Heritage site.
