= San Juan de Yanac District =

Coordinates: 13.2110°S 75.7869°W

San Juan de Yanac Yanaq
- District
- Interactive map of San Juan de Yanac
- Country: Peru
- Region: Ica
- Province: Chincha
- Founded: February 12, 1965
- Capital: San Juan de Yanac

Government
  - Mayor: Edgar Rodríguez

Area
  - Total: 500.4 km^{2} (193.2 sq mi)
- Elevation: 2,550 m (8,370 ft)

Population (2017 census)
  - Total: 1,129
  - Density: 2.256/km^{2} (5.844/sq mi)
- Time zone: UTC-5 (PET)
- UBIGEO: 110208

San Juan de Yanac District is one of eleven districts of the province Chincha in Peru.

It borders to the north with the districts of Chavín and San Pedro de Huacarpana; to the east and south with the province of Castrovirreyna; and to the west with the districts of Chavín and Alto Larán.

== History ==
It was created on February 12, 1965, during the first government of the architect Fernando Belaúnde Terry, by Law No. 15433.

== Climate ==
Climate data for San Juan de Yanac, elevation 2,550 m (8,370 ft), (1991–2020)
Month	Jan	Feb	Mar	Apr	May	Jun	Jul	Aug	Sep	Oct	Nov	Dec	Year
Mean daily maximum °C (°F)	18.6 (65.5)	18.0 (64.4)	18.1 (64.6)	18.9 (66.0)	19.8 (67.6)	19.9 (67.8)	19.7 (67.5)	20.0 (68.0)	20.2 (68.4)	19.8 (67.6)	19.8 (67.6)	18.9 (66.0)	19.3 (66.8)
Mean daily minimum °C (°F)	11.9 (53.4)	11.9 (53.4)	12.0 (53.6)	11.8 (53.2)	11.9 (53.4)	11.9 (53.4)	11.7 (53.1)	11.7 (53.1)	12.2 (54.0)	11.9 (53.4)	11.8 (53.2)	11.8 (53.2)	11.9 (53.4)
Average precipitation mm (inches)	27.3 (1.07)	45.8 (1.80)	40.3 (1.59)	6.1 (0.24)	0.3 (0.01)	0 (0)	0.1 (0.00)	0 (0)	0.7 (0.03)	2.1 (0.08)	2.2 (0.09)	11.8 (0.46)	136.7 (5.37)
Source: National Meteorology and Hydrology Service of Peru
