= El Carmen District, Chincha =

Coordinates: 13.4998°S 76.0575°W

El Carmen
- District
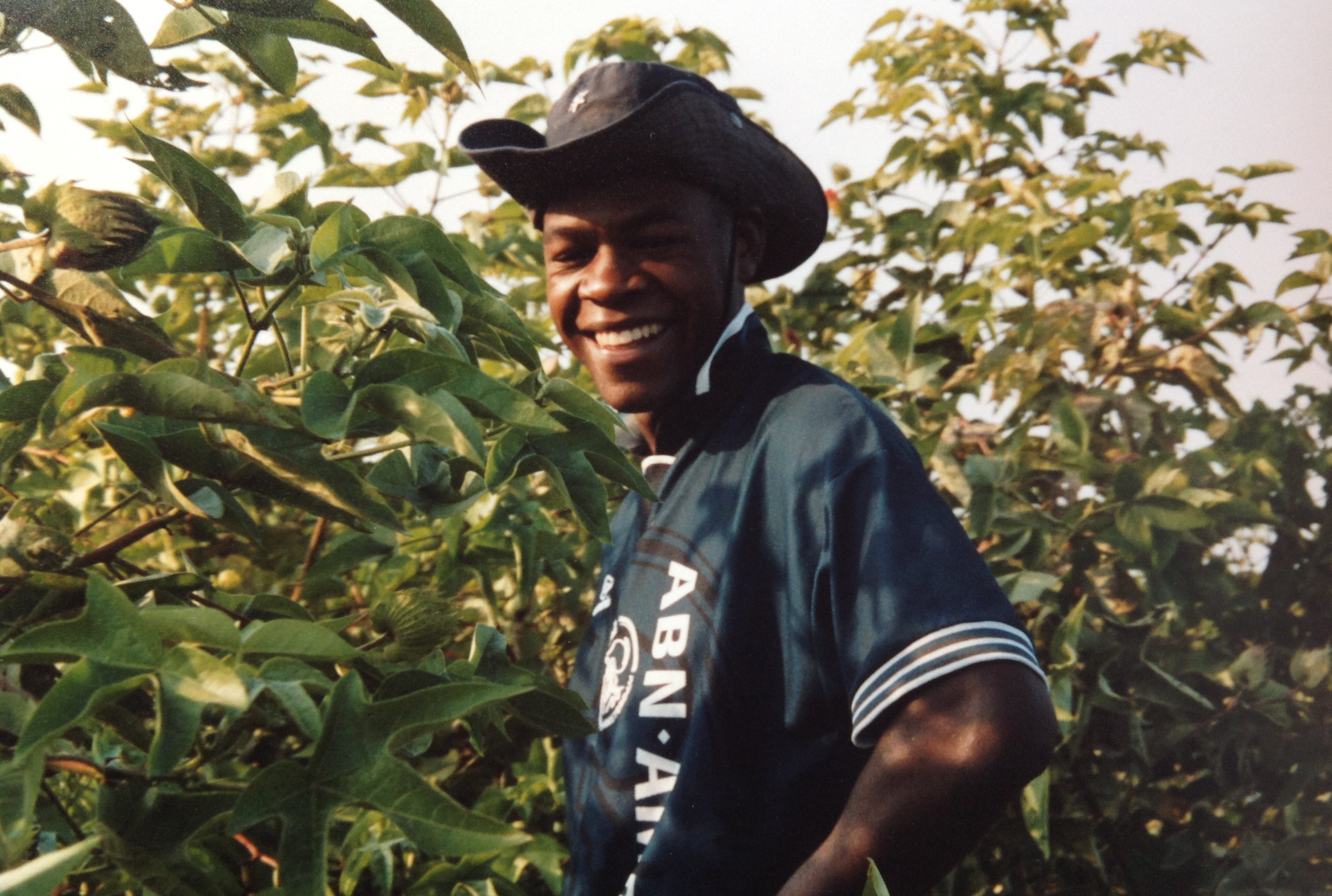
- A person collecting cotton at El Carmen
- Interactive map of El Carmen
- Country: Peru
- Region: Ica
- Province: Chincha
- Founded: August 28, 1916
- Capital: El Carmen

Government
  - Mayor: José Alberto Soria Calderon

Area
  - Total: 790.82 km^{2} (305.34 sq mi)
- Elevation: 155 m (509 ft)

Population (2012 census)
  - Total: 12,777
  - Density: 16.157/km^{2} (41.846/sq mi)
- Time zone: UTC-5 (PET)
- UBIGEO: 110205
- Website: www.munielcarmen.gob.pe/

El Carmen District is one of eleven districts of the province Chincha in Peru.

== Gallery ==
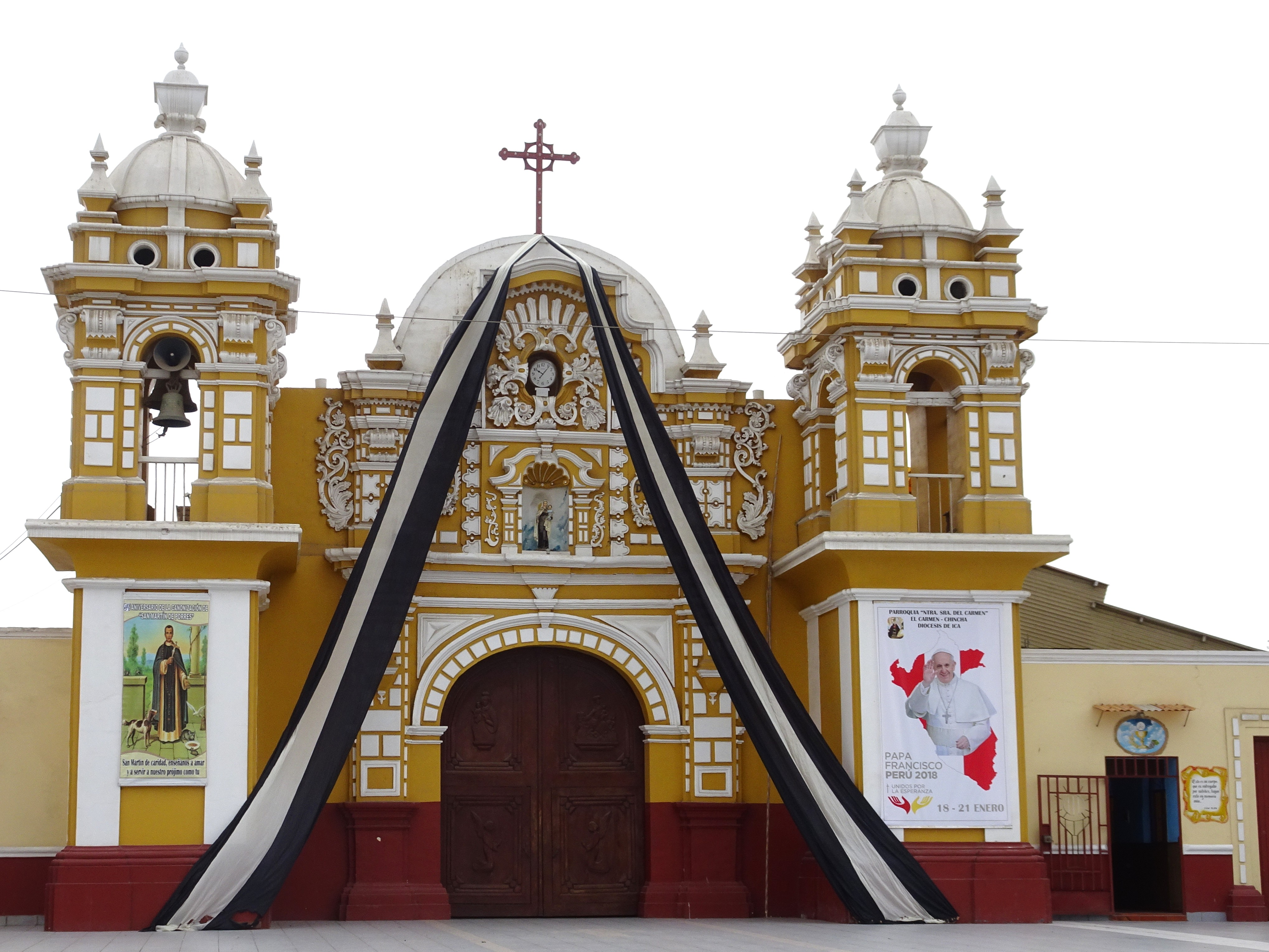
Nuestra Señora Del Carmen

== See also ==
- Hacienda San José (hotel)
