= Alto Larán District =

Coordinates: 13.4426°S 76.0829°W

Alto Larán
- District
- Interactive map of Alto Larán
- Country: Peru
- Region: Ica
- Province: Chincha
- Founded: January 29, 1965
- Capital: Alto Larán

Government
  - Mayor: Ana Sotteccani

Area
  - Total: 298.83 km^{2} (115.38 sq mi)
- Elevation: 137 m (449 ft)

Population (2012 census)
  - Total: 6,972
  - Density: 23.33/km^{2} (60.43/sq mi)
- Time zone: UTC-5 (PET)
- UBIGEO: 110202

Alto Larán District is one of eleven districts of the province Chincha in Peru.
