= Grocio Prado District =

Coordinates: 13.3985°S 76.1564°W

Grocio Prado
- District
- Interactive map of Grocio Prado
- Country: Peru
- Region: Ica
- Province: Chincha
- Founded: December 7, 1914
- Capital: San Pedro

Government
  - Mayor: Luis Tasayco

Area
  - Total: 790.82 km^{2} (305.34 sq mi)
- Elevation: 93 m (305 ft)

Population (2005 census)
  - Total: 22,856
  - Density: 28.902/km^{2} (74.855/sq mi)
- Time zone: UTC-5 (PET)
- UBIGEO: 110205

Grocio Prado District is one of eleven districts of the province Chincha in Peru.

== History ==
The district was created on December 7, 1944, during the first administration of President Manuel Prado Ugarteche.

The name is in honor of the Chinchano hero José Santos Grocio Prado Linares, hero of the Battle of Alto de la Alianza in Tacna, liberator of Cuba and the Philippines, and relative of two second-generation Presidents of the Republic: son of Mariano Ignacio Prado Ochoa and half-brother of Manuel Prado Ugarteche.

== Geography ==
It is a coastal district with an annual growth rate of 1.1%, spread over an area of 190.53 km² and at an altitude of 90.00 m above sea level.
