= San Pedro de Huacarpana District =

Coordinates: 13.0489°S 75.6479°W

San Pedro de Huacarpana
- District
- Interactive map of San Pedro de Huacarpana
- Country: Peru
- Region: Ica
- Province: Chincha
- Founded: September 22, 1951
- Capital: San Pedro de Huacarpana

Government
  - Mayor: Melanio Luis Ayllon Lliuya

Area
  - Total: 222.45 km^{2} (85.89 sq mi)
- Elevation: 3,796 m (12,454 ft)

Population (2012 census)
  - Total: 1,641
  - Density: 7.377/km^{2} (19.11/sq mi)
- Time zone: UTC-5 (PET)
- UBIGEO: 110209

San Pedro de Huacarpana District is one of eleven districts of the province Chincha in Peru.
