= Chavín District =

Coordinates: 13.0771°S 75.9130°W

Chavín
- District
- Interactive map of Chavín
- Country: Peru
- Region: Ica
- Province: Chincha
- Capital: Chavín

Government
  - Mayor: Oscar Javier Vilcamiza Manrique

Area
  - Total: 426.17 km^{2} (164.55 sq mi)
- Elevation: 3,187 m (10,456 ft)

Population (2005 census)
  - Total: 968
  - Density: 2.27/km^{2} (5.88/sq mi)
- Time zone: UTC-5 (PET)
- UBIGEO: 110203

Chavín District is one of eleven districts of the province Chincha in Peru.
