= Sunampe District =

Coordinates: 13.4273°S 76.1643°W

Sunampe
- District
- Interactive map of Sunampe
- Country: Peru
- Region: Ica
- Province: Chincha
- Founded: December 22, 1944
- Capital: Sunampe

Government
  - Mayor: Felix Abraham Rojas De La Cruz

Area
  - Total: 16.76 km^{2} (6.47 sq mi)
- Elevation: 76 m (249 ft)

Population (2005 census)
  - Total: 21,815
  - Density: 1,302/km^{2} (3,371/sq mi)
- Time zone: UTC-5 (PET)
- UBIGEO: 110210

Sunampe District is one of eleven districts of the province Chincha in Peru.

== History ==
As a town, Sunampe has existed since ancient times, spanning all stages of Peruvian history. However, it acquired district status on December 22, 1944, through Law No. 10098, passed during the administration of President Manuel Prado Ugarteche.

During the Pacific War, it was an important center of Chincha resistance against the Chilean invasion.
