= Tambo de Mora District =

Coordinates: 13.4585°S 76.1827°W

Tambo de Mora
- District
- Interactive map of Tambo de Mora
- Country: Peru
- Region: Ica
- Province: Chincha
- Founded: February 5, 1875
- Capital: Tambo de Mora

Government
  - Mayor: Domingo Vicente Farfan Gonzales

Area
  - Total: 22 km^{2} (8.5 sq mi)
- Elevation: 15 m (49 ft)

Population (2005 census)
  - Total: 4,682
  - Density: 210/km^{2} (550/sq mi)
- Time zone: UTC-5 (PET)
- UBIGEO: 110211

Tambo de Mora District is one of eleven districts of the province Chincha in Peru.
