= Chuin =

Chuin چوئين
- Village
- Location within Iran
- Coordinates: 35°24′55″N 46°31′18″E
- Country: Iran
- Province: Kurdistan
- County: Marivan
- Bakhsh: Central
- Rural District: Kumasi

Population (2006)
  - Total: 170
- Time zone: UTC+3:30 (IRST)
  - Summer (DST): UTC+4:30 (IRDT)

Chuin (Persian: چوئين, also Romanized as Chū’īn; also known as Chāvīn, Chawīn, and Shāhīn) is a village in Kumasi Rural District, in the Central District of Marivan County, Kurdistan Province, Iran. At the 2006 census, its population was 170, in 40 families. The village is populated by Kurds.
