= Chincha Baja District =

Coordinates: 13.4590°S 76.1617°W

Chincha Baja
- District
- Interactive map of Chincha Baja
- Country: Peru
- Region: Ica
- Province: Chincha
- Founded: October 20, 1537
- Capital: Chincha Baja

Government
  - Mayor: Emilio Marcelo Del Solar Salazar

Area
  - Total: 72.52 km^{2} (28.00 sq mi)
- Elevation: 41 m (135 ft)

Population (2012 census)
  - Total: 12,387
  - Density: 170.8/km^{2} (442.4/sq mi)
- Time zone: UTC-5 (PET)
- UBIGEO: 110204
- Website: www.chinchabaja.md.gob.pe

Chincha Baja District is one of eleven districts of the province Chincha in Peru.

== History ==
Chincha Baja is the oldest district of the province and the entire region. It was created with the name of "Villa Santiago de Almagro" on October 20, 1537, by the conquistador Diego de Almagro. During the Pacific War it served as the headquarters of the Chileans. Within its boundaries is the administrative center of Chincha kingdom, known as Huaca "The Sentinel".

The district was created in the early years of the Republic of Peru.

== Climate ==
Climate data for Fonagro (Chincha), elevation 71 m (233 ft), (1991–2020)
Month	Jan	Feb	Mar	Apr	May	Jun	Jul	Aug	Sep	Oct	Nov	Dec	Year
Mean daily maximum °C (°F)	27.4 (81.3)	28.5 (83.3)	28.1 (82.6)	26.5 (79.7)	23.6 (74.5)	21.2 (70.2)	20.2 (68.4)	19.8 (67.6)	20.7 (69.3)	21.6 (70.9)	23.1 (73.6)	25.2 (77.4)	23.8 (74.9)
Mean daily minimum °C (°F)	19.9 (67.8)	20.6 (69.1)	20.1 (68.2)	18.0 (64.4)	15.7 (60.3)	14.7 (58.5)	14.4 (57.9)	14.4 (57.9)	14.6 (58.3)	14.9 (58.8)	15.7 (60.3)	17.7 (63.9)	16.7 (62.1)
Average precipitation mm (inches)	0.6 (0.02)	0.8 (0.03)	0.6 (0.02)	0 (0)	0.3 (0.01)	1.1 (0.04)	1.6 (0.06)	1.1 (0.04)	1.0 (0.04)	0.6 (0.02)	0.3 (0.01)	0.4 (0.02)	8.4 (0.31)
Source: National Meteorology and Hydrology Service of Peru
