= Chincha Alta =

- Town
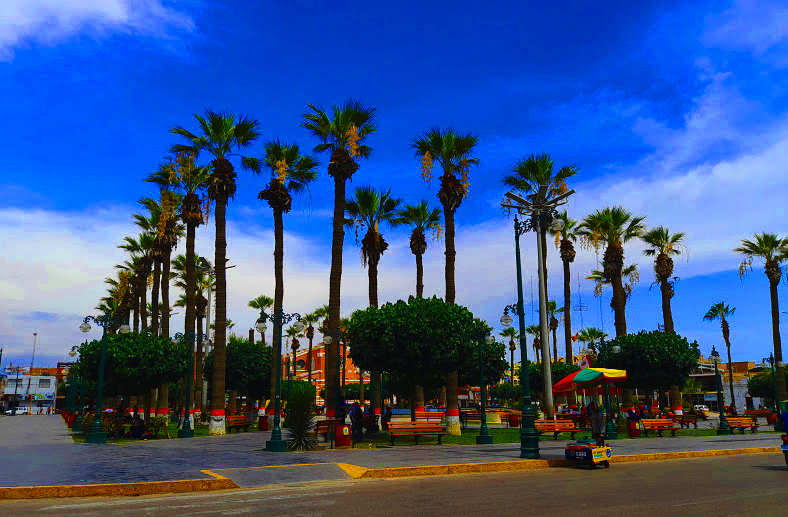
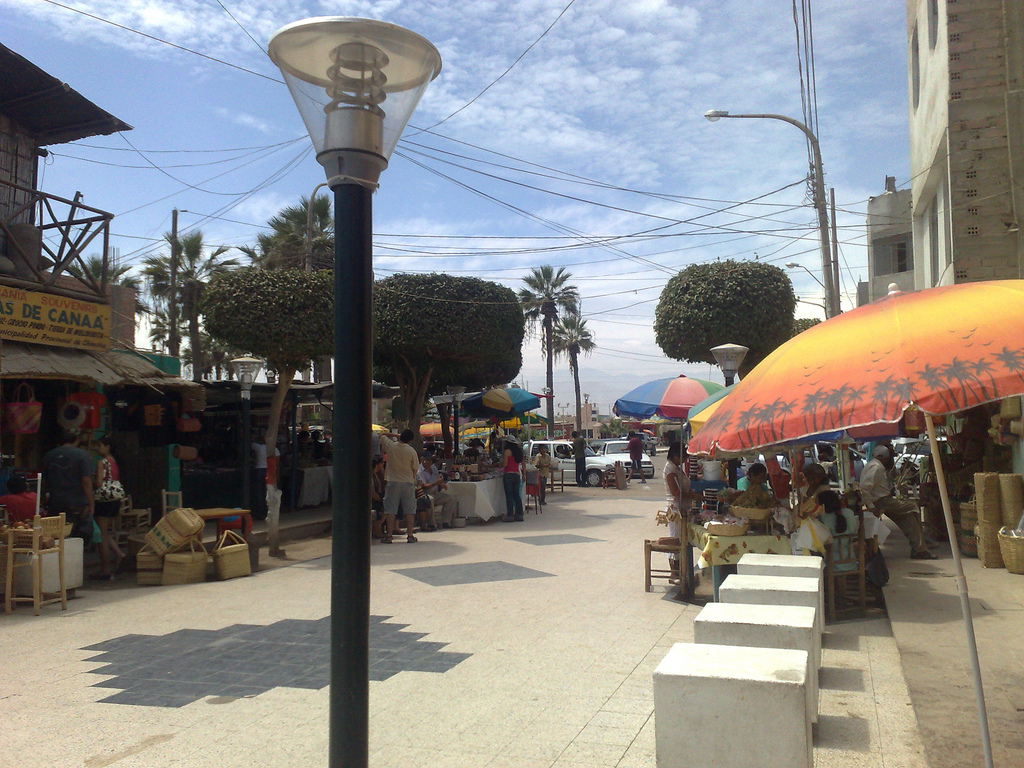
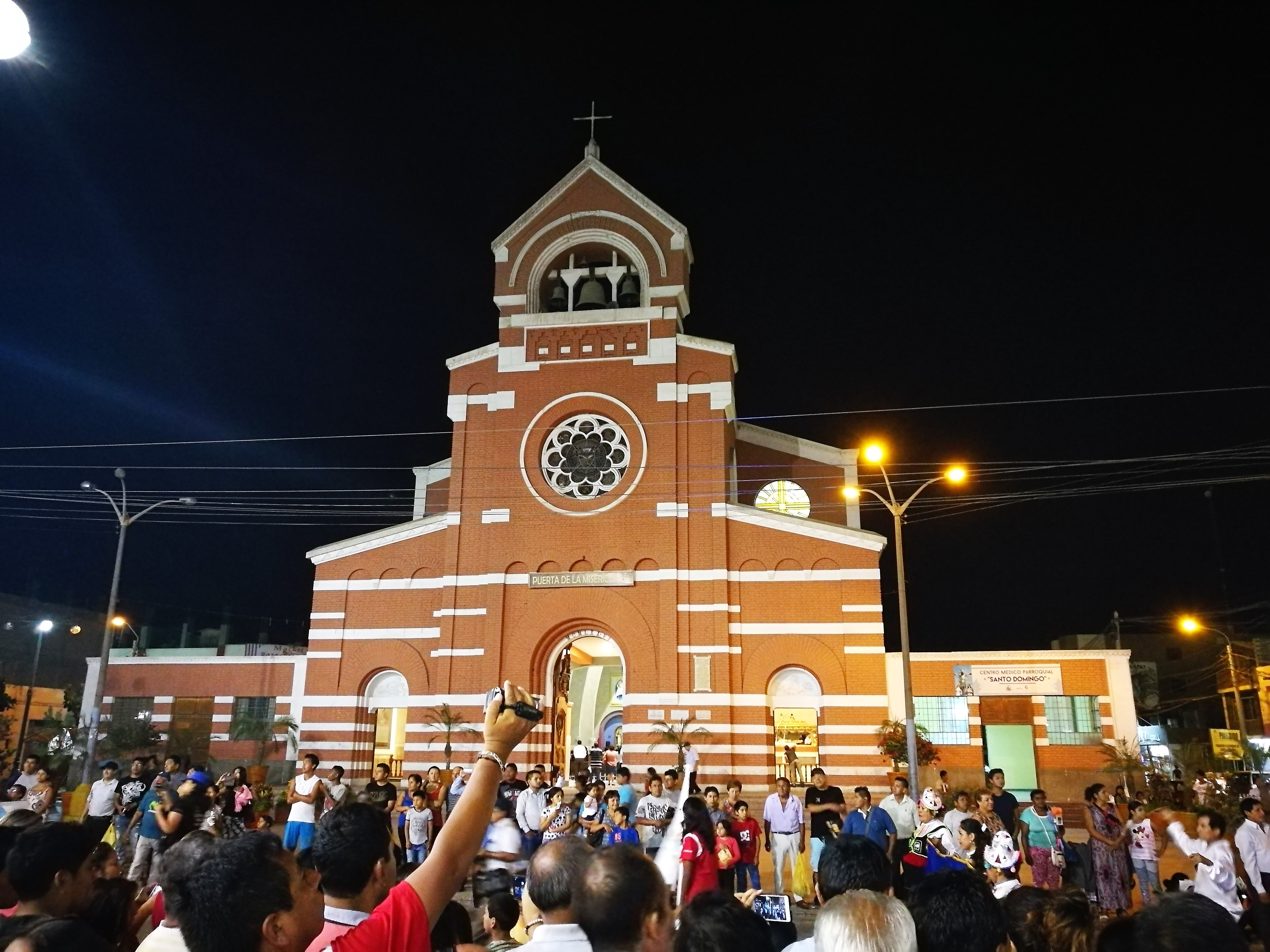
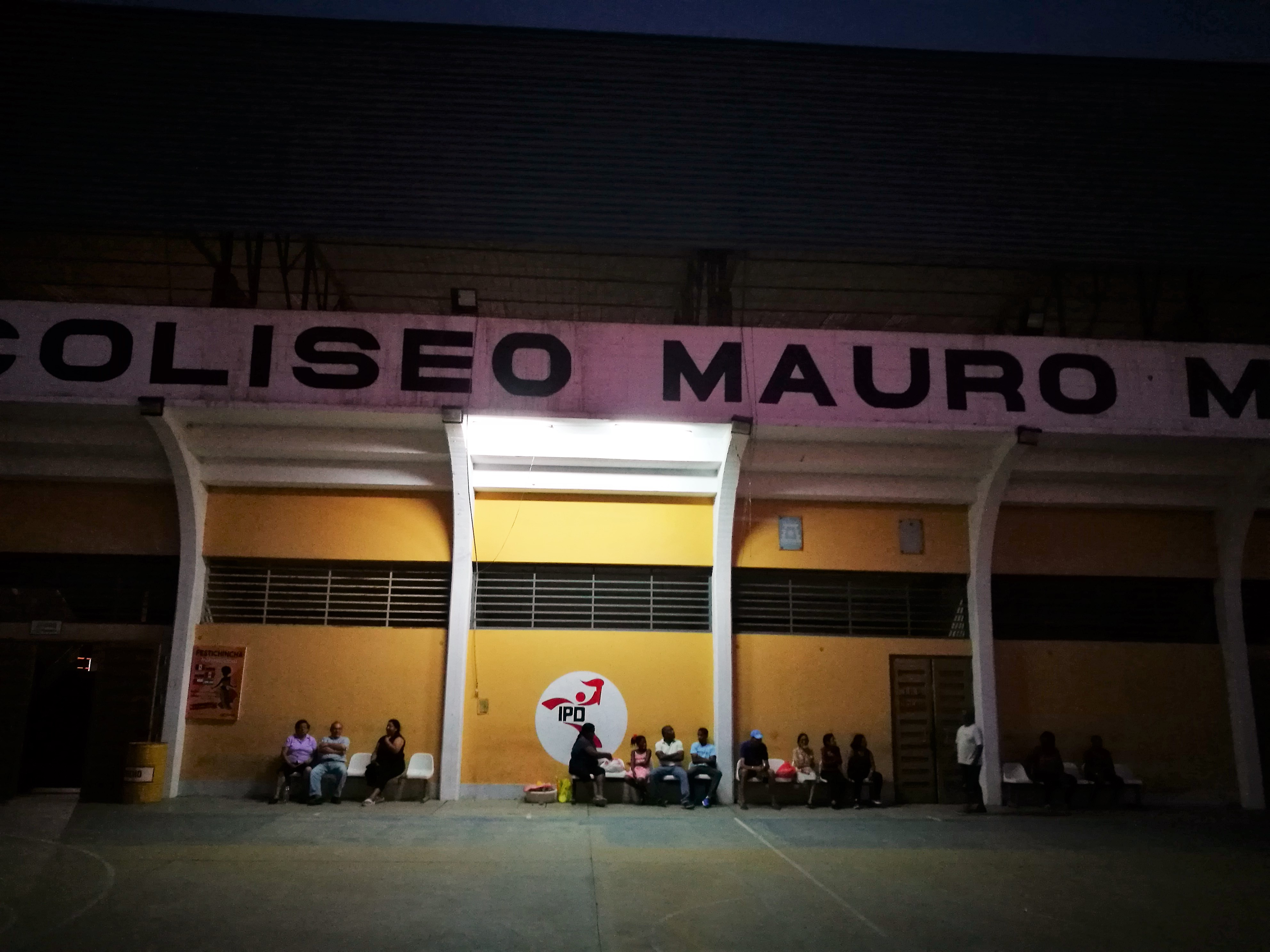
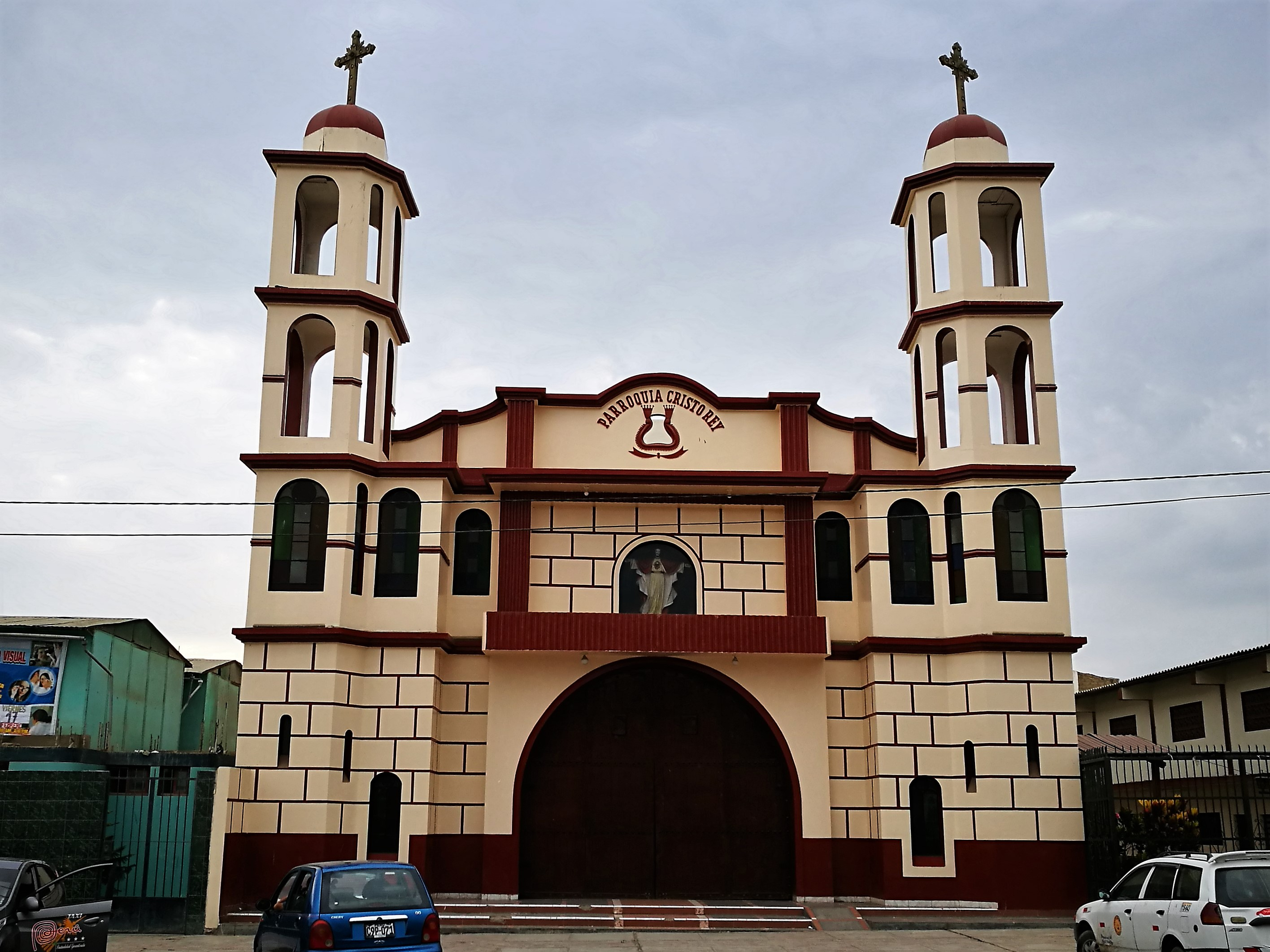
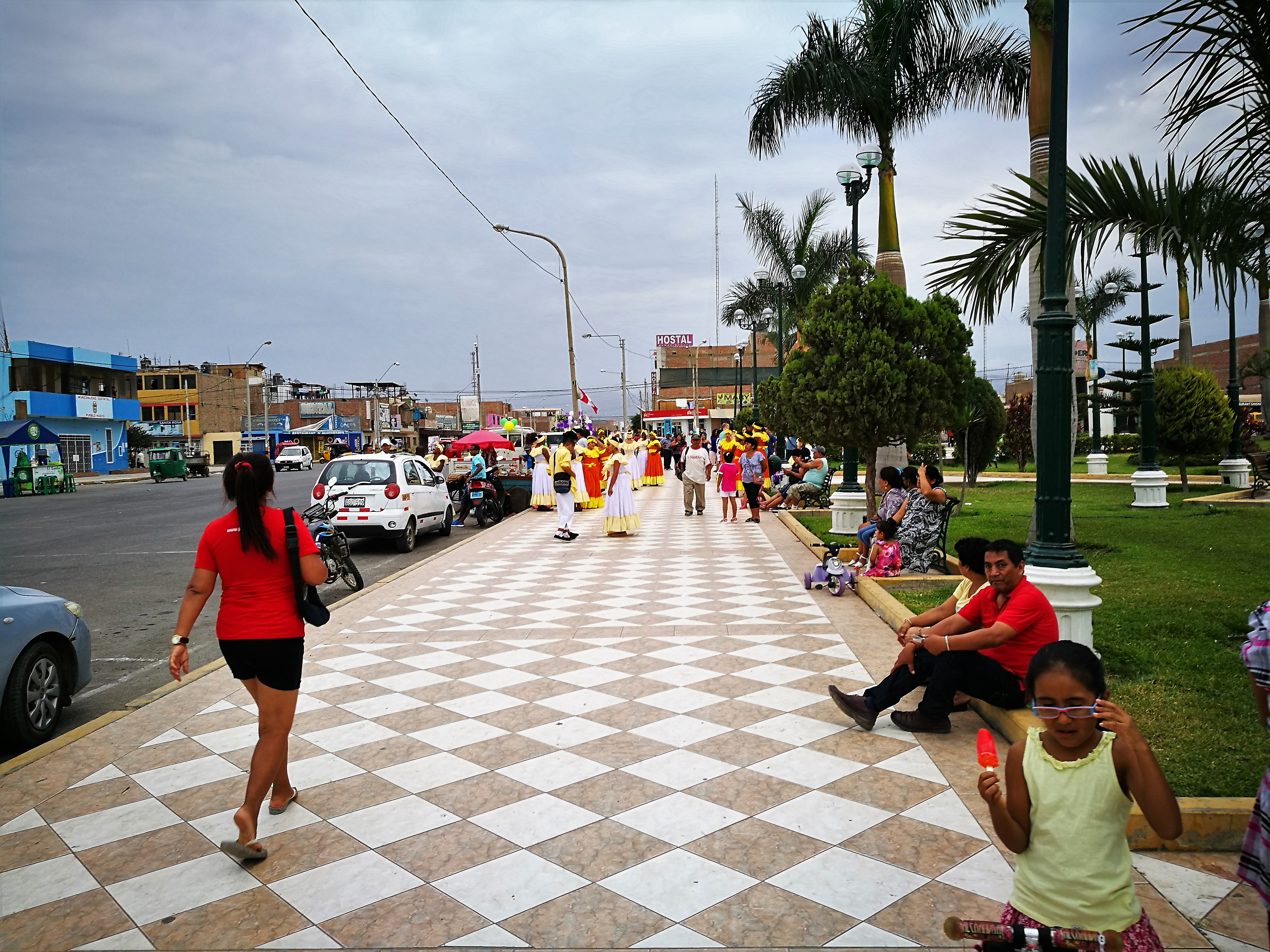

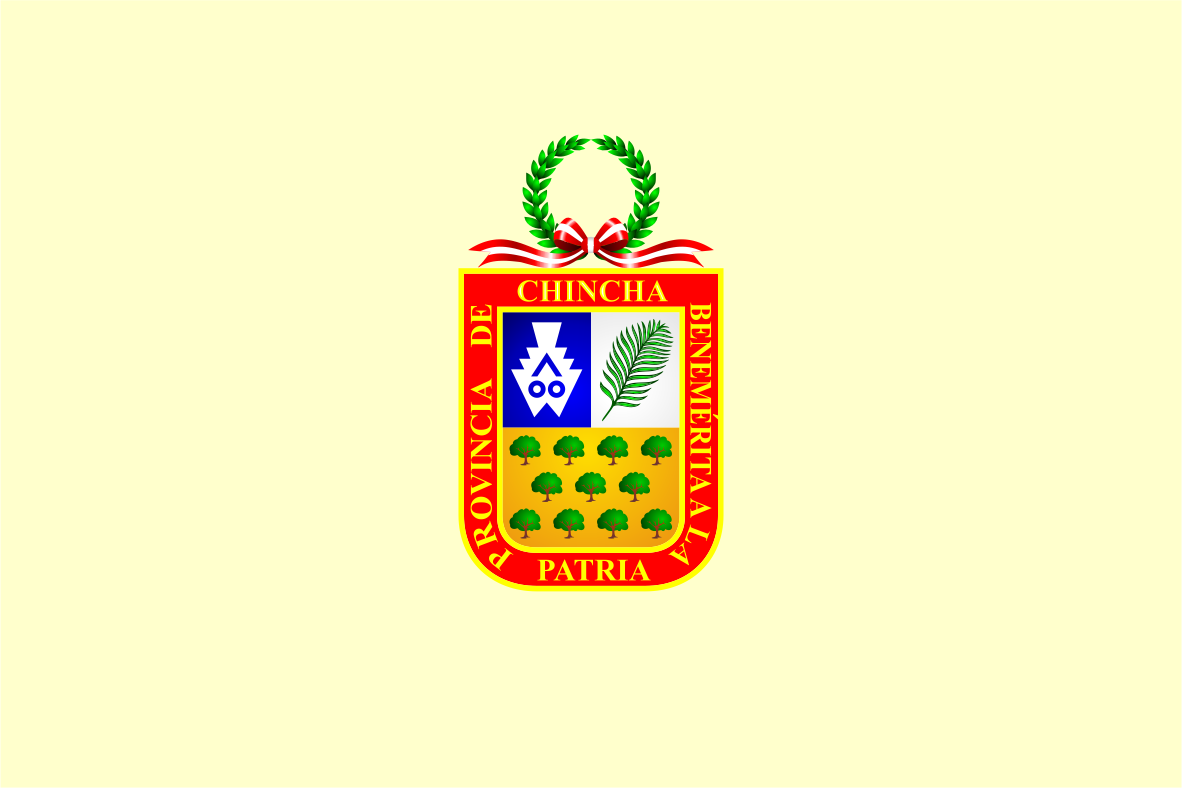
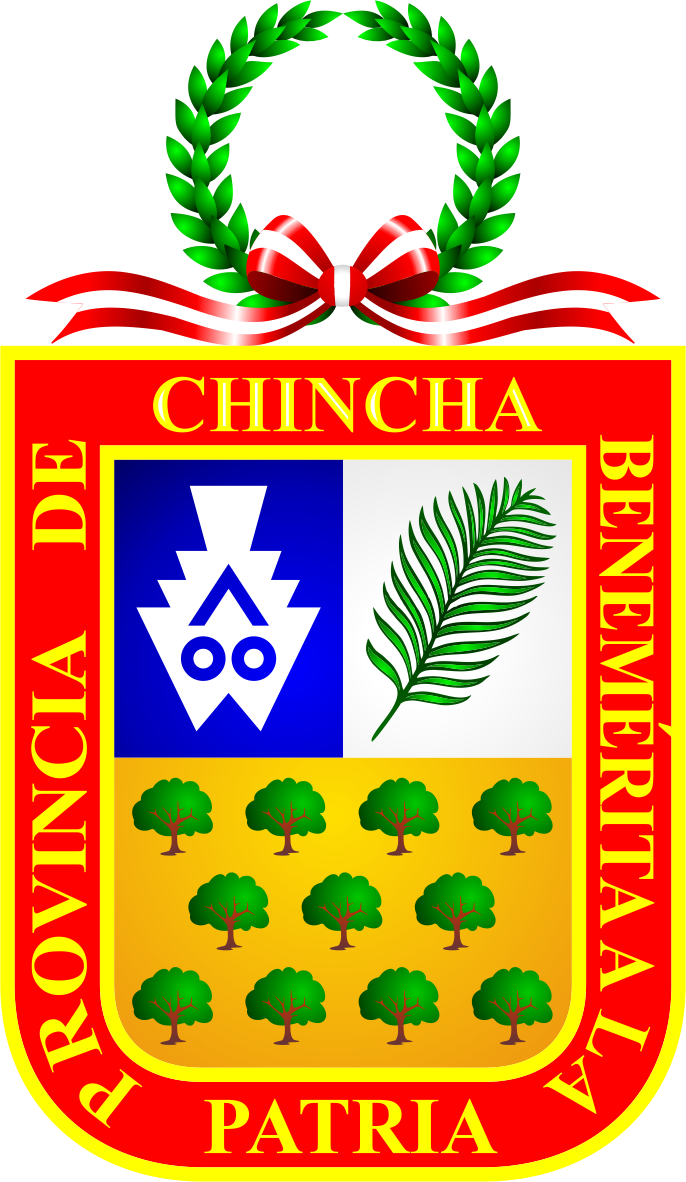
- Flag Seal
- Nickname: "Cuna de campeones" (Cradle of Champions)
- Location within Peru
- Coordinates: 13°27′S 76°08′W
- Country: Peru
- Region: Ica
- Province: Chincha

Government
  - Mayor: Armando Huamán Tasayco

Area
  - Total: 2,988 km^{2} (1,154 sq mi)
- Elevation: 97 m (318 ft)

Population
  - Estimate (2015): 177,219
- Demonym: Chinchano/a
- Time zone: UTC-5 (PET)
  - Summer (DST): UTC-5 (PET)
- Website: www.munichincha.gob.pe

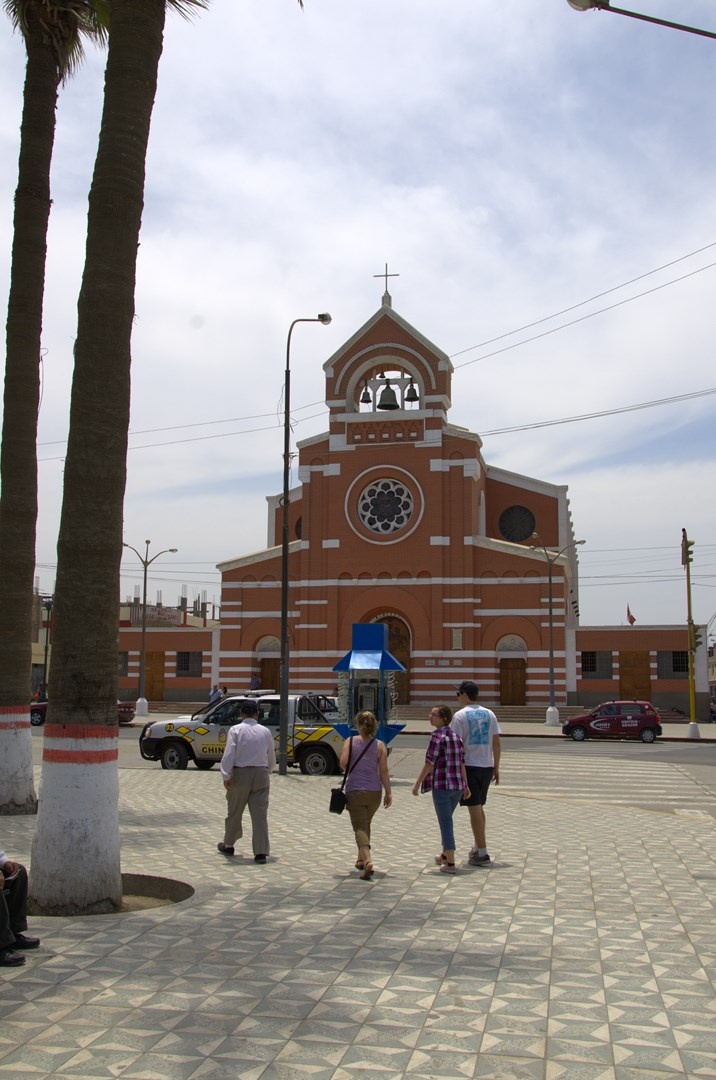
main squaire of Chincha with the Santo Domingo Church in down town Chincha, Summer 2014

Chincha Alta, also known as simply Chincha, is a city located in the Ica Region of Peru. A major port at the mouth of the Chincha River, it is the capital of Chincha Province. The city has a population of about 233,000, making it the 17th largest city in Peru.

== Geography ==
The City of Chincha Alta is located 200 kilometers south of Lima, in the Chincha Province of the Ica Region of Peru. The city covers an area of 2988 km^{2} and has a population of 56,085.

== History ==
=== Pre-Chincha era ===
The first inhabitants of the area arrived at the beginning of the ninth century. These people are known as the "Pre-Chincha". The historian Luis Cánepa Pachas puts the date of the arrival of the Pre-Chincha at sometime in the tenth century. The rudimentary Pre-Chincha culture was centered on fishing and shell gathering. The origin of the Pre-Chincha people is still uncertain.

=== Chincha culture ===
In the eleventh century, a more advanced and warlike people known as the Chincha arrived in the coastal area. The Chincha had developed systems of architecture, agriculture and irrigation. The Chincha came to dominate the original inhabitants of the area. Some aspects of the original Pre-Chincha culture were absorbed by the newcomers. The word Chincha is derived from "Chinchay" or "Chinchas" or "Cinca" which means "ocelot" in Chincha Quechua. The Chincha worshiped an ocelot god, and believed themselves to be descended from ocelots, who gave them their warlike and dominating tendencies. The Chincha fertilized their fields with dead birds and guano, and this knowledge was passed on to later peoples. The Chincha learned seafaring skills from the Pre-Chincha, and may have traveled as far as Central America by boat.

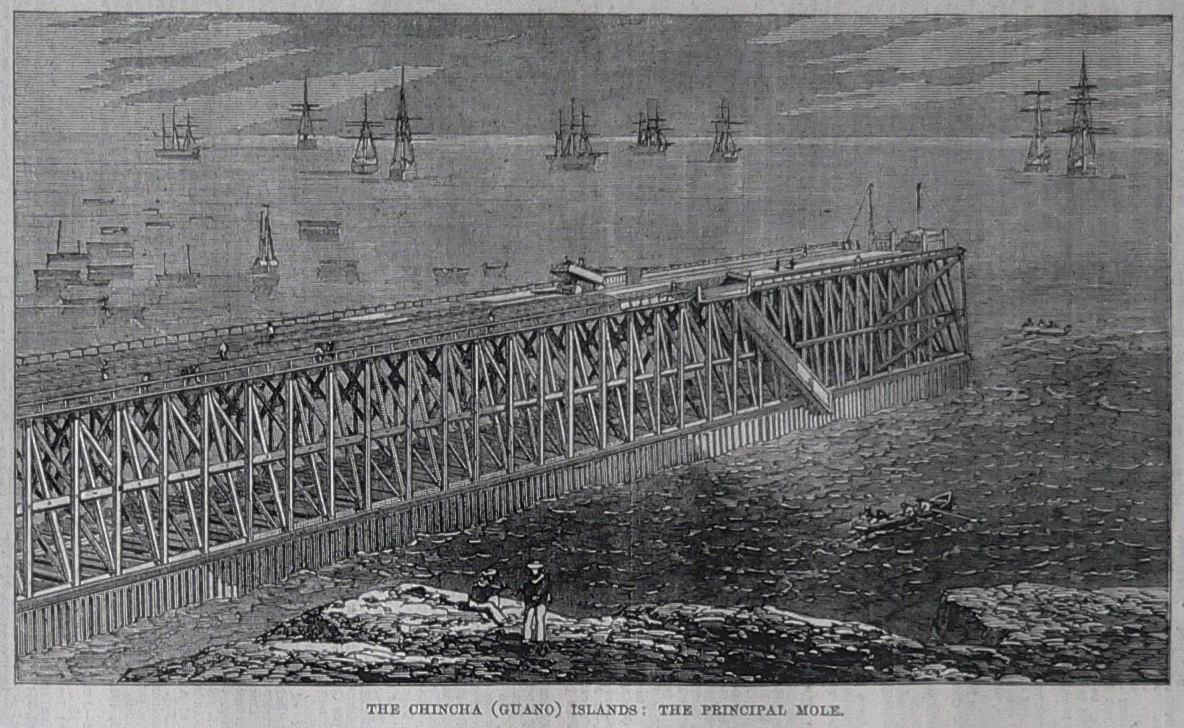
A bay in Chincha, 1863

=== Inca era ===
Between 1458 and 1460, the Chincha were conquered by the armies of the Inca Empire led by Tupac Inca Yupanqui during the reign of his father, Pachacuti. The Chincha area became an important part of the Inca Empire, and the Inca valued the Chincha for their agricultural knowledge, military skill and trade routes.

=== Colonial era ===
The Chincha region was then conquered by the Spanish, the area suffered a 99 percent decline in population in the first 85 years of Spanish rule and many places regressed into wilderness, Africans brought by the Spanish began to settle in the region en masse, some of the Chincha's surrounding areas became a haven for fugitive African slaves known by the Spanish as Cimarrones.

=== Modern era ===
In the early 19th Century, Chincha was known to British mariners as Chinca or Chinka. In late 1806, the British privateers Port au Prince and Lucy collaborated in capturing some Spanish vessels off the coast there and engaged in some inconclusive battles with the Spanish frigate Astraea.

The Chincha Islands, which are off the coast of Peru near Chincha and Pisco, were the focal point of the Chincha Islands War between Peru and Spain between 1864 and 1866.

=== 2007 earthquake ===
The city, along with others near the Pacific coast, was damaged during the 2007 Peru earthquake.

== Culture ==
=== African art and music ===
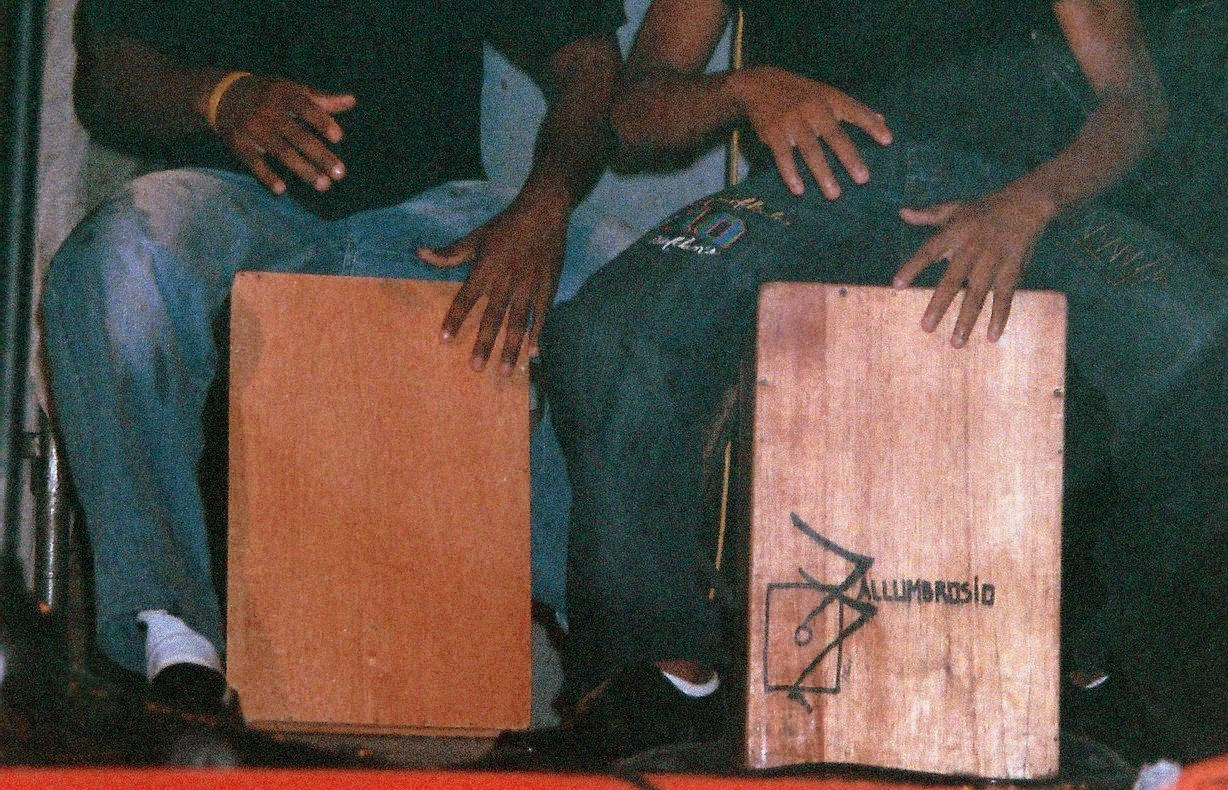
Drummers playing the Cajón

Afro-Peruvian culture has thrived in Chincha Alta, and the Afro-Peruvian residents of El Carmen district practice many traditional dances. The use of the Cajón drum, maracas and other traditional instruments figure prominently in Afro-Peruvian music, which is popular throughout the region. Traditional dances are performed during the Christmas season.

=== Afro-Peruvian folk culture ===
During February the "Verano Negro" (literally "Black Summer") festival is held, celebrating Afro-Peruvian food, music, culture and dance. The cuisine of the Chincha Alta area is considered distinct from other parts of Peru, because of its African background.

== Climate ==
Climate data for Chincha Alta, elevation 71 m (233 ft), (1991–2020)
Month	Jan	Feb	Mar	Apr	May	Jun	Jul	Aug	Sep	Oct	Nov	Dec	Year
Mean daily maximum °C (°F)	27.4 (81.3)	28.5 (83.3)	28.1 (82.6)	26.5 (79.7)	23.6 (74.5)	21.2 (70.2)	20.2 (68.4)	19.8 (67.6)	20.7 (69.3)	21.6 (70.9)	23.1 (73.6)	25.2 (77.4)	23.8 (74.9)
Mean daily minimum °C (°F)	19.9 (67.8)	20.6 (69.1)	20.1 (68.2)	18.0 (64.4)	15.7 (60.3)	14.7 (58.5)	14.4 (57.9)	14.4 (57.9)	14.6 (58.3)	14.9 (58.8)	15.7 (60.3)	17.7 (63.9)	16.7 (62.1)
Average precipitation mm (inches)	0.6 (0.02)	0.8 (0.03)	0.6 (0.02)	0 (0)	0.3 (0.01)	1.1 (0.04)	1.6 (0.06)	1.1 (0.04)	1.0 (0.04)	0.6 (0.02)	0.3 (0.01)	0.4 (0.02)	8.4 (0.31)
Source: National Meteorology and Hydrology Service of Peru

== Anthem ==
It was composed in 1984 by Mrs. Ana Maria del Solar and Manolo Andrade Avalos, creators of the music and lyrics respectively, and approved by Municipal Resolution No. 1440 on 30 October of the same year. It has a chorus and three verses which commend and exalt the beauty of the Chincha region as well as the courage and heroism of its people.
