= Chincha province =

Coordinates: 13°27′S 76°08′W

Chincha
- Province
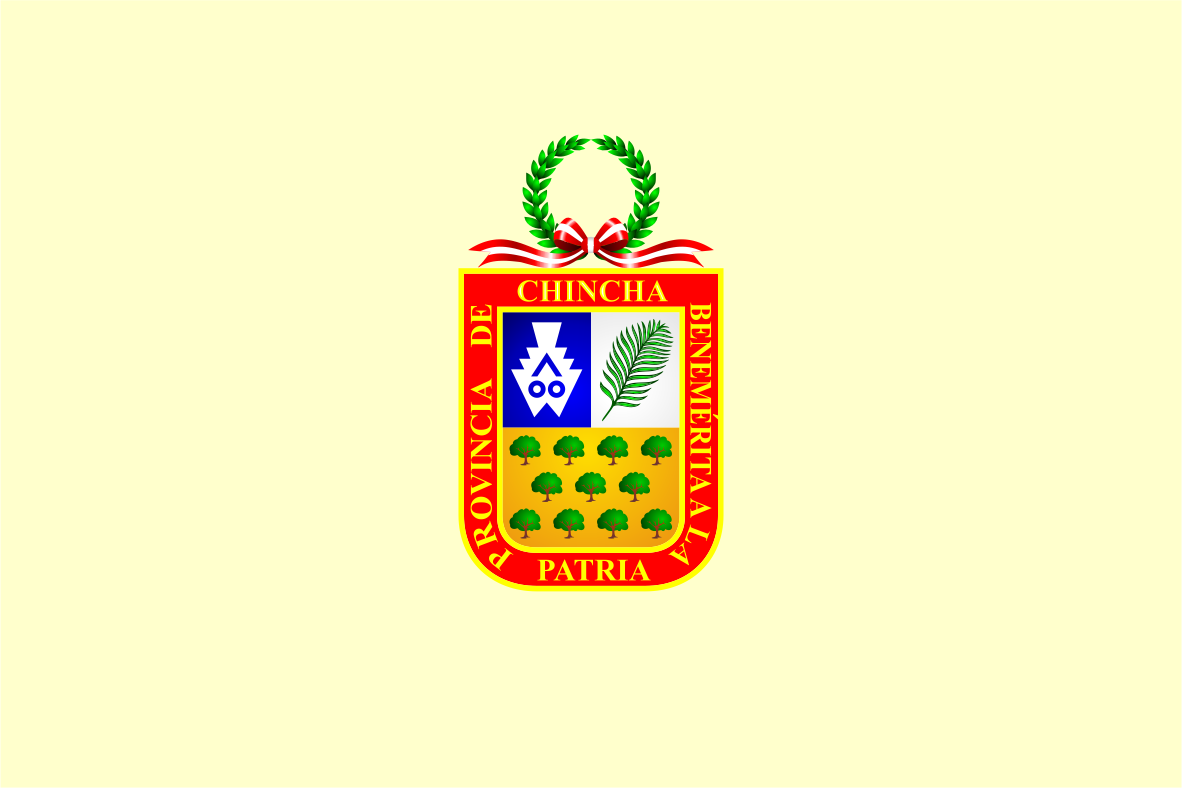
- Flag Coat of arms

- Location of Chincha in the Ica Region
- Country: Peru
- Region: Ica
- Capital: Chincha Alta

Government
  - Mayor: Armando Huamán Tasayco (2019-2022)

Area
  - Total: 2,988.27 km^{2} (1,153.78 sq mi)

Population (2005 census)
  - Total: 181,777
  - Density: 60.8302/km^{2} (157.549/sq mi)
- UBIGEO: 1102

Chincha is one of five provinces of the Ica Region of Peru. The capital of the province is the city of Chincha Alta, a center where the culture of the Black Peruvians developed. It is characterized by its schools and fabric textiles.

== Geography ==
=== Boundaries ===
- North: Lima Region
- East: Huancavelica Region
- South: province of Pisco
- West: Pacific Ocean

=== Political division ===
The province of Chincha is divided into eleven districts (Spanish: distritos, singular: distrito), each of which is headed by a mayor (alcalde):

==== Districts ====
- Alto Larán
- Chavín
- Chincha Alta
- Chincha Baja
- El Carmen
- Grocio Prado
- Pueblo Nuevo
- San Juan de Yanac
- San Pedro de Huacarpana
- Sunampe
- Tambo de Mora

== See also ==
- Administrative divisions of Peru
