= List of accidents and incidents involving the Cessna 208 Caravan =

This is a list of accidents and incidents involving the Cessna 208 Caravan

== 1993 ==
- August 26 - A Cessna 208A Caravan I registration PT-OGN was hijacked and set on fire after landing at Sinop. There were no victims.

== 2001 ==
- April 28 – A Cessna 208 crashed on Buenos Aires after icing. The plane was en route from Trelew to El Calafate. All ten died.
- September 18 – A Cessna 208 Caravan I (F-OHRM) owned by an A. Trichot was substantially damaged after being blown over by a gust of wind while standing and subsequently written off.
- October 10 - PenAir Flight 350, a C208 crashed shortly after takeoff after a loss of control. All ten died.

== 2003 ==
- September 11 - Wasaya Airways Flight 125, a C208 crashed near Nibinamik First Nations, Canada, killing the eight onboard

== 2004 ==
- January 17 - Georgian Express Flight 126 crashed after takeoff due to ice. All ten died

== 2005 ==
- January 31 – A Nord-Flyg AB Cessna C208B on a cargo flight to Sweden crashed on the ground between the first and third runways soon after take-off. The reason of the accident was stalling caused by snow and ice left on the upper surface of the wing. The pilot, the only person on the plane, was slightly injured in the accident.

== 2007 ==
- December 4 – a Maya Island Air Cessna 208B Caravan V3-HFS was taking off from Corozal Airport for a flight to San Pedro Airport, when the pilots aborted takeoff but were not able to stop the airplane on the remaining runway. The Grand Caravan struck a barbed wire fence and ran into several orange trees before coming to a halt some 520 feet beyond the runway. The undercarriage was sheared off and the airplane sustained substantial damage to the belly. None of the 12 passengers and crew were killed or injured in the accident.
- On December 5 – a Castle Aviation owned and operated Cessna C208B Super Cargomaster (N28MG) was flying from Rickenbacker International Airport to Buffalo Niagara International Airport when it crashed less than one minute after takeoff. The NTSB report indicated the probable cause of the crash was the pilot's failure to maintain aircraft control and collision avoidance with terrain due to spatial disorientation, with low cloud ceiling and night conditions contributing to the accident. The pilot and a passenger died in the crash. Also noteworthy is another Castle Aviation Super Cargo Master (N27MG) was at the departure airport stuck in the snow where it had departed the pavement while taxiing for takeoff ahead of N28MG. N28MG taxied past the stuck N27MG and departed after deicing.

== 2008 ==
- August 24 – In the 2008 Aéreo Ruta Maya crash, a Cessna 208 Caravan crashed 45 minutes after takeoff from La Aurora International Airport, Guatemala, en route to El Estor, Guatemala; 11 of the 14 passengers and crew were killed.

== 2009 ==
- January 9 - A Peruvian Navy Caravan crashed on takeoff from Rio Tigre.
- April 17 – A Línea Turística Aereotuy Cessna 208 crashed into an embankment. One person died and the rest survived.
- October 29 – A Força Aérea Brasileira Cessna 208 FAB-2725 flying from Cruzeiro do Sul, Acre to Tabatinga crash-landed in the Ituí River a small tributary of the Rio Javari, Amazonas State. The twin-engined turboprop aircraft of the 7º Esquadrão de Transporte Aéreo from Base Aérea de Manaus was transporting officials from Brazilian Ministry of Health participating in a vaccination programme when the aircraft crashed landed between the Amazonian villages of Aurelius and New River. The aircraft was later found by indigenous villagers of the region, discovering 9 survivors and 2 dead crew members.

== 2011 ==
- July 4 – A Missinippi Airways Cessna 208 Caravan overran the runway and crashed in a ravine at Pukatawagan Airport, Manitoba, Canada, following an aborted takeoff. One passenger was killed.
- October 14 – A Cessna 208 Grand Caravan crashed shortly after taking off from Xakanaka Airstrip, Botswana. The pilot and seven passengers were killed, with four passengers surviving the crash

== 2013 ==
- October 21 – A Cessna 208B Grand Caravan registered as N861MA and operating Mokulele Airlines Flight 1710 made an emergency landing on the Piilani Highway on Maui after its engine failed while en route from Kahului Airport to Waimea-Kohala Airport on Hawaii (island). There were no injuries. During the landing, the airplane struck two highway traffic signs, causing substantial damage to the wing. The aircraft was moved to a parking lot adjacent to the highway during the NTSB investigation and was later dismantled, returned to an airport, reassembled, and returned to service.
- December 11 – A Makani Kai Air Cessna 208 crashed into the water en route. One person died, and the rest survived.

== 2015 ==
- On 8 August 2015, one of Slingairs's Cessna 208 Caravan aircraft (registration VH-LNH) experienced an oil leak which forced them to return to their airport of origin.

== 2016 ==
- February 10 – a Castle Aviation owned and operated Cessna C208B Super Cargomaster slid off of a runway at Cleveland Hopkins International Airport in winter weather conditions. This runway excursion resulted in the closing of a runway and several flights being diverted.
- July 20 – Joy General Aviation Flight 6005, a Cessna 208 Amphibian, crashed into a bridge shortly after take-off, killing 5 of the 10 on board.
- November 16 – one of Aviair's Cessna 208 Caravan aircraft (registration VH-LNH) made a forced landing 8 km north-west of Solomon Airport, Western Australia due to an engine failure.

== 2017 ==
- December 31 – Nature Air Flight 144, a Cessna 208 Caravan, crashed shortly after takeoff from Punta Islita Airport, Costa Rica. All 12 passengers and crew were killed.

== 2018 ==
- June 5 – Fly-SAX Flight 102, A Cessna 208B Grand Caravan flying from Kitale to Nairobi, crashed in the Aberdare mountains. All 10 people on board were killed.
- October – A Cessna Grand Caravan 208-EX PK-JBR crashed in Papua carrying a passenger named Daus in Beoga, Puncak Regency in Papua.

== 2022 ==
- February 26 – AB Aviation Flight 1103 crashed into the sea, in front of Moheli Island on final approach. All 14 people died.
- April 13 – A Cessna 208 Caravan registration N928JP, operating a cargo flight, crashed while on approach to the Burley Municipal Airport. The only occupant on board died.

== 2023 ==
- June 23 – A SAM Air aircraft Cessna 208 Caravan with registration PK-SMW crashed shortly after takeoff from Elelim Airport in Yalimo Regency, Papua Mountains Province. This accident resulted in the death of 4 passengers and 2 crew members.
- July 17 – A Cessna 208 crashed into a hangar in Chrcynno, Poland. Six people died.

== 2024 ==
- August 22 – Thai Flying Service Flight 209, a Cessna 208 Grand Caravan flying from Bangkok to Ko Mai Si, Thailand, crashed in a mangrove swamp shortly after taking off from Suvarnabhumi Airport, killing all nine people on board.
- December 17 – Kamaka Air Flight 689, a Cessna 208 crashed into an abandoned building shortly after takeoff from Daniel K. Inouye International Airport. Both pilots died.

== 2025 ==
- January 7 – A Swan River Seaplanes Cessna 208 Caravan crashed into the water at Rottnest Island, Western Australia, Australia. Out of the seven occupants on board, three people were killed including the pilot and three others were injured.
- February 6 – Bering Air Flight 445, a Cessna 208B Grand Caravan flying from Unalakleet to Nome, Alaska, disappeared over Norton Sound, and the crash site was located the following day. All 10 people on board were killed.
- July 2 – A Cessna 208, operating a skydiving flight, crashed after it went off the runway at Cross Keys Airport in Williamstown, New Jersey. 15 people were on board, and they were all rushed to the hospital with various injuries.
- April 17 – Tropic Air Flight 711, a Cessna 208B Grand Caravan EX, was hijacked while flying from Corozal to San Pedro in Belize. Low on fuel, the aircraft made an emergency landing in Belize City. On landing, the hijacker injured three of the 15 other occupants and was then shot dead by an armed passenger.
- August 25 - A Cessna 208 on a cargo flight with 2 people on board overran the runway and went into a wooden fence. The pilots survived, however the plane was destroyed by fire.
- October 28 – Mombasa Air Safari Flight 203, a Cessna 208 crashed near Kwale, Kenya, killing all 11 people on board.
- December 2 – A Samaritan's Purse Cessna 208 Caravan was hijacked in South Sudan. The hijacker demanded to go to Chad, but the aircraft diverted to Wau. All three people on board survived.

== 2026 ==
- January 7 – A Cessna 208 Caravan Amphibian aircraft, registered 4R-CAE and operated by Cinnamon Air, plunged into Lake Gregory in Nuwara Eliya while attempting to land at the nearby Lake Gregory Waterdrome. No passengers were on board and the two pilots were injured but rescued safely.
- January 10 – IndiaOne Air Flight 102, a Cessna 208B Grand Caravan, crash-landed near Rourkela, Odisha, India. All 6 occupants Initially survived the crash landing, all with serious injuries but 1 passenger later died in the hospital just 2 days later.
- January 27 - A Smart Air Cessna Caravan with registration PK-SNS had an engine failure and ditched near Nabire, Papua, Indonesia. All occupants survived.
- April 10 - An Air Services Limited Cessna 208 on a cargo flight crashed in a wooded area. The pilot, the only person on board was killed.
- April 27 - A CityLink Cessna 208B Grand Caravan crashed near Juba, South Sudan, after a domestic flight from Yei. All 14 people on board were killed.
- August 1 - A Aerodiana Cessna 208 Caravan crashed near Pueblo Viejo in Peru after departing from Pisco Airport (PIO) at 12:10 local time. All eleven passengers and two crew members on board were killed.
- October 8 - A Cessna 208B airplane carrying valuables from the Central Bank of Ecuador was unable to brake while landing in Mariscal Lamar International Airport and ran off the runway onto Hurtado de Mendoza Avenue without fatalities.
