= 金山 =

金山 (literally Gold Mountain) may refer to:

== Hong Kong ==
- Kam Shan Country Park (金山郊野公園)

== Japan ==
- Kanayama, a surname (including a list of people with the surname)
- Kanayama Station (Aichi), of Nagoya, Aichi Prefecture
- Kanayama Station (Fukuoka), of Fukuoka, Fukuoka Prefecture
- Kanayama Station (Hokkaido), of Sorachi District, Hokkaido
- Kaneyama, Fukushima, a town in Fukushima Prefecture
- Kaneyama, Gifu, formerly a town in Gifu Prefecture
- Kaneyama, Yamagata, a town in Yamagata Prefecture
- Kaneyama, Hyogo, a mountain in Hyogo Prefecture

== Mainland China ==
- Jinshan District (金山区), Shanghai
- Mount Jin (Zhenjiang), mountain in Zhenjiang, Jiangsu
- Jinshan Subdistrict (金山街道), name of various subdistricts in the PRC
  - Jinshan Subdistrict, Fuzhou, in Cangshan District, Fuzhou, Fujian
  - Jinshan Subdistrict, Xiamen, in Huli District, Xiamen, Fujian
  - Jinshan Subdistrict, Gaozhou, Guangdong
  - Jinshan Subdistrict, Meizhou, in Meijiang District, Meizhou, Guangdong
  - Jinshan Subdistrict, Chaozhou, in Xiangqiao District, Chaozhou, Guangdong
  - Jinshan Subdistrict, Fuquan, Guizhou
  - Jinshan Subdistrict, Yichun, Heilongjiang, in Jinshantun District, Yichun, Heilongjiang
  - Jinshan Subdistrict, Hebi, in Qibin District, Hebi, Henan
  - Jinshan Subdistrict, Daye, Hubei
  - Jinshan Subdistrict, Zhuzhou, in Hetang District, Zhuzhou, Hunan
  - Jinshan Subdistrict, Zhenjiang, in Runzhou District, Zhenjiang, Jiangsu
  - Jinshan Subdistrict, Xuzhou, in Quanshan District, Xuzhou, Jiangsu
  - Jinshan Subdistrict, Benxi, in Mingshan District, Benxi, Liaoning
- Towns named Jinshan (金山镇)
  - Jinshan, Nanchuan District, Chongqing
  - Jinshan, Dazu County, Chongqing
  - Jinshan, Nanjing County, Fujian
  - Jinshan, Guyang County, Inner Mongolia
  - Jinshan, Ganyu County, Jiangsu
  - Jinshan, Dandong, in Yuanbao District, Dandong, Liaoning
  - Jinshan, Leshan, in Wutongtiao District, Leshan, Sichuan
  - Jinshan, Luojiang County, Sichuan
  - Jinshan, Shangli County, Zhejiang
- Jinshan Township (disambiguation) (金山乡), which currently refers only to mainland divisions
- Altyn-Tagh, a mountain range
  - Altun Shan National Nature Reserve (阿尔金山)
- Kingsoft, software developer

== Taiwan ==
- Jinshan District, New Taipei (金山區), in New Taipei, Republic of China (Taiwan)

== United States ==
- San Francisco, California (舊金山)

== See also ==
- Kim Sơn (disambiguation)
- Gold Mountain (disambiguation)
- Jinshan (disambiguation)
