= Guihua =

Guihua can refer to

- Osmanthus fragrans
- a part of Hohhot, Inner Mongolia, China
- Guihua Subdistrict, a subdistrict of Hetang District, Zhuzhou, Hunan, China
