= Sarah Roberts =

Sarah or Sara Roberts may refer to:

- Sarah Roberts (actress) (born 1984), Australian television and film actress
- Sarah Roberts (politician) (born 1974), American politician from Michigan
- Sarah T. Roberts (born 1975), professor who specializes in content moderation of social media
- Sarah T. Roberts (epidemiologist), American epidemiologist
- Sarah Roberts (One Life to Live), a character from the American serial drama One Life to Live
- Sarah Roberts (subject of vampire legend) (1872–1913), Englishwoman said to be a vampire in Peru
- Sarah Jakes Roberts (born 1988), American pastor, author, and nonprofit executive
- Sara Weeks Roberts (1865–1932), American social reformer and activist
