= Songjiaqiao =

Subdistrict in Hetang District, Hunan, China

Coordinates: 27°52′50″N 113°11′55″E

Songjiaqiao (Chinese: 宋家桥街道; pinyin: Sòngjiāqiáo Jiēdào) is a subdistrict of Hetang District in Zhuzhou, Hunan, China. It has an area of 35.9 km^{2} (13.9 sq mi) with a population of 43,700 (as of 2017). The town has 7 villages and 3 communities under its jurisdiction.

== History ==
The subdistrict of Songjiaqiao was formed in 1969, it was originally a subdistrict of East District (Chinese: 东区) in Zhuzhou. Through the district adjustment of Zhuzhou in 1997, the East District was dissolved, the subdistrict was transferred to Yuetang District formed in the year.

In 2005, its three communities of Jingoushan, Yanjiawan and Xianghua were merged to Jinshan Subdistrict, its four communities of Guihua, Xinhe, Zhaojiachong and Xiangyang to Guihua Subdistrict. In the year, the subdistrict of Songjiaqiao covered an area of 8.6 km^{2} (3.3 sq mi) with a population of 27,138 (as of 2005), it had three villages of Xincun, Tiantai and Songjiaqiao, and two communities of Sisanling and Furong under its jurisdiction.

In 2017, Five villages of Fenlukou, Xingxing, Jintang, Mingzhao and Longzhou from Xianyu Town were changed to the subdistrict. The subdistrict of Songjiaqiao covers an area of 35.9 km^{2} (13.9 sq mi) with a population of 43,700 (as of 2017), it has 7 villages and 3 communities under its jurisdiction.

== Subdivisions ==
In 2017, Five villages of Fenlukou, Xingxing, Jintang, Mingzhao and Longzhou from Xianyu Town were merged to the subdistrict. The subdistrict has 7 villages and 3 communities under its jurisdiction.

7 villages

- Fenlukou Village (Chinese: 分路口村)
- Jintang Village (Chinese: 金塘村)
- Longzhou Village (Chinese: 龙洲村)
- Mingyue Village (Chinese: 明照村)
- Songjiaqiao Village (Chinese: 宋家桥村)
- Tiantai Village (Chinese: 天台村)
- Xingxing Village (Chinese: 星星村)

3 communities

- Furong Community (Chinese: 芙蓉社区)
- Sisanling Community (Chinese: 四三0社区)
- Yuegui Community (Chinese: 月桂社区)
