= 2026 Aerodiana Cessna 208 crash =

2026 aviation accident in Peru

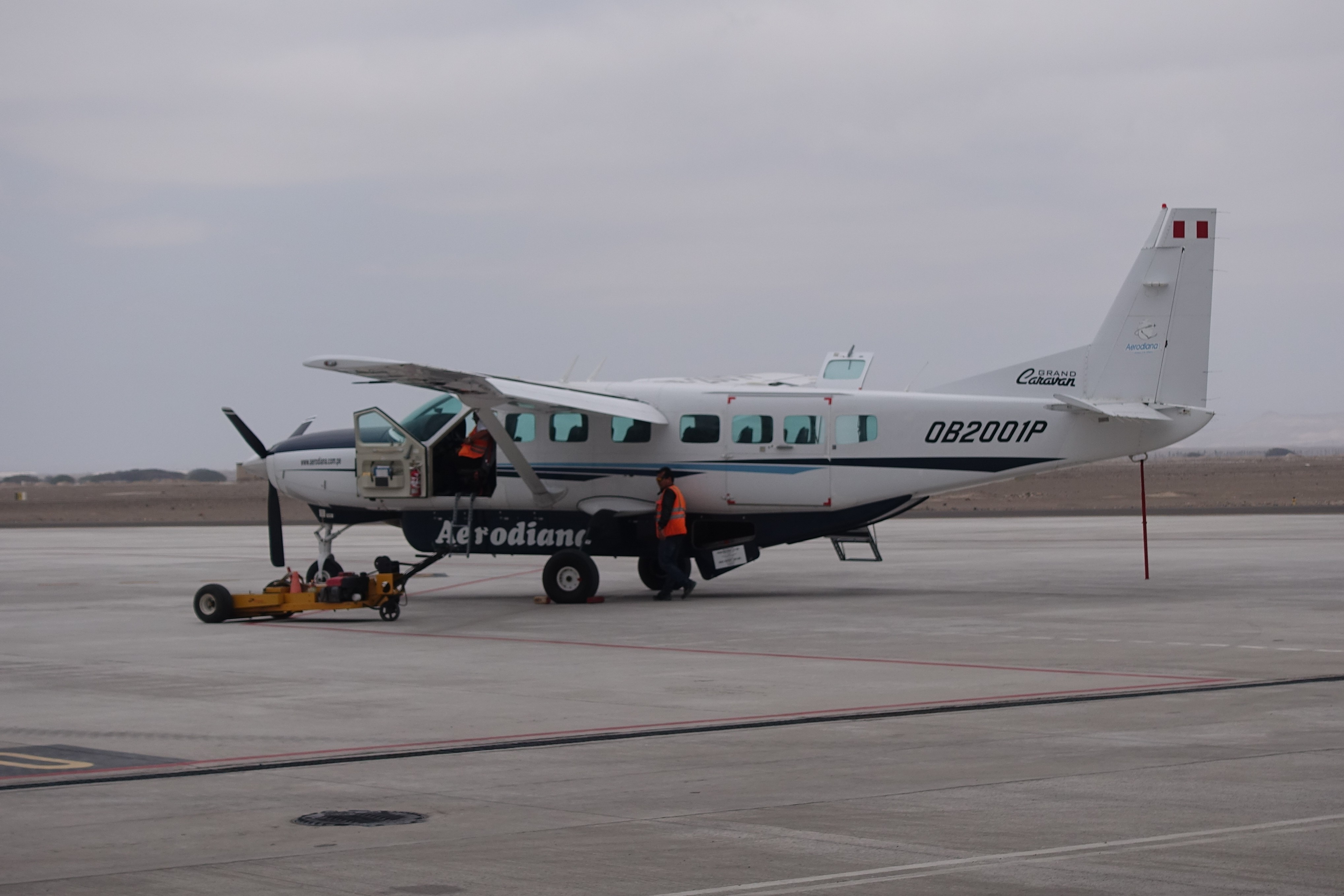
- OB-2001-P, the aircraft involved in accident, seen in 2017 with the previous livery

Accident
- Date: 1 August 2026
- Summary: Loss of control and possible mid-air break up during route, under investigation
- Site: Near Nazca, Department of Ica, Peru; 14°50′31″S 74°59′33″W

Aircraft
- Aircraft type: Cessna 208B Grand Caravan
- Operator: Aerodiana
- Registration: OB-2001-P
- Flight origin: Capitán FAP Renán Elías Olivera Airport, Pisco, Peru
- Destination: Capitán FAP Renán Elías Olivera Airport, Pisco, Peru
- Occupants: 13
- Passengers: 11
- Crew: 2
- Fatalities: 13
- Survivors: 0

On 1 August 2026, a Cessna 208 Caravan aircraft operated by Aerodiana crashed near Nazca, Peru, while performing a sightseeing flight over the Nazca Lines World Heritage Site. The aircraft departed from Capitán FAP Renán Elías Olivera Airport in Pisco, Peru. All 13 people on board were killed. Peruvian authorities launched an investigation into the crash.

== Background ==
=== Aircraft ===
The aircraft involved in the accident was a Cessna 208B Grand Caravan, registered as OB-2001-P, which was operated and owned by the local company Aerodiana. The aircraft was chartered by the travel agency Perù A Travel for a sightseeing flight over the Nazca Lines.

=== Occupants ===
Those aboard the aircraft included seven Italian, two Spanish, and two German tourists alongside the two Peruvian pilots (captain Americo Salazar and first officer Irenka del Carpio).

== Accident ==
The aircraft departed Capitán FAP Renán Elías Olivera Airport in Pisco, Peru, for a sightseeing flight at around 00:10 PET, with two pilots and eleven passengers on board. While cruising, at 13:01 PET, the pilots declared an emergency, stating that a loss of control had occurred. Soon afterwards, contact with the aircraft was lost and it crashed near the Panamericana Sud road, near the village of Pueblo Viejo in the vicinity of Nazca. A nearby plane was sent to check the condition of the Aerodiana flight, and its pilot spotted a large plume of smoke coming from the ground. Rescue teams stated that the aircraft was completely destroyed and had caught fire on impact. All thirteen people on board were killed. The crash site was closed by the police for the recovery of bodies and aircraft parts.The bodies of the victims were take to a morgue at Ica Medical Center for identification.

== Investigation ==
The Peruvian agencies on flight safety CIAA and DGAC, coordinated by the Ministry of Transport and Communications, immediately launched an investigation into the accident. The crash site was subjected to restricted access and investigators recovered pieces of wreckage. It is currently unknown if the aircraft was carrying a flight recorder. On August 4, Peruvian authorities invited agencies from the United States (the country where the aircraft was manufactured), Italy, Spain and Germany, to take part in the investigation.

Peruvian authorities stated that weather was being considered as the most probable cause of the crash. Strong winds, often exceeding 40 km/h, locally called Paracas winds, hit the region in the days prior to the crash, causing damage to trees and structures, and also bringing large quantities of sand and dust at high altitudes, reducing visibility. Capitán FAP Renán Elías Olivera Airport in Pisco had been closed until July 31, and high winds were still present at the higher altitudes where the plane was cruising. After the crash, Pisco airport was closed again and Aerodiana rescheduled its service.

Videos published online by the Peruvian news channel Noticias de Piura appeared to show the aircraft descending out of control towards the ground and breaking up in mid-air. These videos were initially considered by the investigators, but were later dismissed as fake after an analysis of the wreckage.

On 3 August, Peruvian aviation authorities forced Aerodiana to temporary suspend its operations while investigators checked the airline's adherence to safety regulations.

== Reactions ==
Peruvian president Keiko Fujimori sent condolences to the families of the victims and stated that authorities were offering support, as were the embassies and consulates of the countries of origin of the foreign passengers. Italian prime minister Giorgia Meloni sent her condolences to the families of the victims; while foreign minister Antonio Tajani stated that he was in continuous contact with the Italian embassy in Lima. The German and Italian consuls in Lima visited the crash site on August 3.

Aerodiana issued a statement in which they offered their condolences to the families of the victims, and stated that they were collaborating thoroughly with investigative authorities and helping them collect evidence. The airline rescheduled its flight after the accident.

== See also ==
- Widerøe Flight 839, a de Havilland Canada DHC-6 that lost control in high winds
