= SPSO =

SPSO may refer to:

- Scottish Public Services Ombudsman, an ombudsman that handles complaints about public services in Scotland
- SportSouth, a regional sports network in the Southern United States
- Airport code for Capitán FAP Renán Elías Olivera Airport in Peru
