= Xiaojinshan =

Xiaojinshan may refer to:

- Xiaojinshan (Yangzhou), in Slender West Lake, Yangzhou, Jiangsu, China
- Xiaojinshan, one of the islands of Shanghai, China

== See also ==
- Jinshan (disambiguation)
- Dajinshan Island
