= Jinshan =

Jinshan can refer to:

== Mainland China ==
- Jinshan District (金山区), Shanghai

Subdistricts (金山街道)

- Jinshan Subdistrict, Fuzhou, in Cangshan District, Fuzhou, Fujian
- Jinshan Subdistrict, Xiamen, in Huli District, Xiamen, Fujian
- Jinshan Subdistrict, Meizhou, in Meijiang District, Meizhou, Guangdong
- Jinshan Subdistrict, Chaozhou, in Xiangqiao District, Chaozhou, Guangdong
- Jinshan Subdistrict, Yichun, Heilongjiang, in Jinshantun District, Yichun, Heilongjiang
- Jinshan Subdistrict, Hebi, in Qibin District, Hebi, Henan
- Jinshan Subdistrict, Zhuzhou, in Hetang District, Zhuzhou, Hunan
- Jinshan Subdistrict, Zhenjiang, in Runzhou District, Zhenjiang, Jiangsu
- Jinshan Subdistrict, Xuzhou, in Quanshan District, Xuzhou, Jiangsu
- Jinshan Subdistrict, Benxi, in Mingshan District, Benxi, Liaoning

Towns

- Jinshan Township (disambiguation) (金山乡)
- Jinshan town (锦山镇), seat of the Harqin Banner, Chifeng, Inner Mongolia

== Taiwan ==
- Jinshan District, New Taipei (金山區)

== Others ==
- San Francisco, California, in the United States, known in Chinese as "Old Jinshan" (t 舊金山 or s 旧金山)
- Melbourne, Australia, known in Chinese as "New Jinshan" (Xīn Jīnshān)
- Kingsoft (金山软件), anti-virus software

== See also ==
- 金山 (disambiguation), for topics that are still written as "金山" but not necessarily romanised to "Jinshan"
- Dajinshan Island
- Xiaojinshan (disambiguation)
