= Penstemon kingii =

- A flowering stem from the north side of Gold Mountain, Esmeralda County, Nevada

Scientific classification
- Kingdom: Plantae
- Clade: Tracheophytes
- Clade: Angiosperms
- Clade: Eudicots
- Clade: Asterids
- Order: Lamiales
- Family: Plantaginaceae
- Genus: Penstemon
- Species: P. kingii

Binomial name
- Penstemon kingii S.Watson

Synonyms
- Penstemon kingii var. glaucus; Penstemon nyeensis

Plant species in the veronica family

Penstemon kingii, the King's penstemon, is a rare species from Nevada and southeastern Oregon. It has dark to light purple flowers and is part of the veronica family.

== Description ==
King's penstemons are perennial herbs, but they are frequently somewhat shrub-like at the base. The stems are usually 7–25 centimeters (3–10 in) long, but can on occasion reach 30 cm (12 in), and can grow outwards along the ground or curve to grow upwards. Even if growing upwards the base of the stems will tend to rest on the ground. Each plant will tend to have several flowering stems growing from its branched caudex, but only sometimes have a large taproot. They are frequently thickly covered in sharp, backwards pointing hairs, looking like they have been covered in ashes, but those on the stems and leaves are never glandular.

The plants have all their leaves attached to the flower stems, usually six to twelve leaves attached in pairs to opposite sides, but sometimes just four leaves per flowering stem. Like the stems they are covered in pointed hairs, sometimes puberulent, short and erect hairs, but at times retrorse like on the stems, backwards pointing. The leaves are not glaucous and are attached to the stems by very short leaf stalks or directly by the tapering base of the leaf. The leaf edges are smooth, without teeth, and the end comes to a blunt or narrow point. They are 1.7–8 centimeters (0.5–3 in) long, though usually less than 5 cm (2 in) and just 2–10 millimeters wide, but usually less than 7 mm.

Blooming is during May, June, or July in its native habitat. The flowers can be red-violet to dark purple-blue in color and are covered in glandular hairs. They lack floral guide lines and can also be blue or violet. The flower petals are fused into a funnel shape that is inflated on the lower side. The flower opens to five lobes, the upper two short and projecting while the lower lobes are bent backwards. The overall flower length is 15–22 mm with a tube that is 5–7 mm. The inside of the flower is hairless and has stamens that are entirely inside the flower tube or the longer two just reaching the mouth. The sterile staminode is hairless, 11–13 mm long and just reaches or extends out of the floral mouth slightly.

The fruit is a capsule 6–10 mm long and 4–6 mm wide. The seeds contained within are 1.2–2.2 mm long.

== Taxonomy ==
In 1871 a description of a new species in the Penstemon genus was published by the botanist Sereno Watson, naming it Penstemon kingii. With the rest of its genus it is classifed in the Plantaginaceae family. The species has no accepted varieties, but one named glaucus was described by Albert Kellogg in 1873. It has one other heterotypic synonym, a species published in 1965 by Frank Samuel Crosswhite.

=== Names ===
The species name is a Botanical Latin form of the last name of Clarence King, an American who explored the western United States. It is similarly known by the common name King's penstemon or King's beardtongue.

== Range and habitat ==
The species is native to Nevada and Oregon in the western United States. Most of the range is in Nevada where it is found eight counties from central to northwest, Esmeralda, Nye, Eureka, Elko, Lander, Churchill, Pershing, and Humboldt. In Oregon it is only confirmed in the southeastern part of the state in Malheur County.

It grows in mountainous areas at elevations of 1,500 to 2,100 meters (4,900–6,900 ft). Mountain ranges where it has been observed include the Jackson Mountains and Santa Rosa Range in northern Nevada, east of there in the Independence Mountains, Adobe Range, East Humboldt Range, Ruby Mountains, and Desatoya Mountains. In the central portions of the state it is known from the Toiyabe, Toquima, Monitor, Kawich, Schell Creek, and Gold Mountain ranges. They grow in valleys of the sagebrush scrub and in pinyon–juniper woodlands.

== See also ==
- List of Penstemon species
