= Cigutang =

Subdistrict in Zhuzhou, Hunan, China

Coordinates: 27°50′55″N 113°9′16″E

Cigutang (Chinese: 茨菇塘街道; pinyin: Cígūtáng Jiēdào) is a subdistrict of Hetang District in Zhuzhou, Hunan, China. It has an area of 6.7 km^{2} (2.6 sq mi) with a population of 62,347 (as of 2010). The subdistrict has 14 communities under its jurisdiction. Its seat is Cigutang (茨菇塘).

== History ==
The subdistrict of Cigutang was formed in 1969, it was originally a subdistrict of East District (Chinese: 东区) in Zhuzhou. Through the district adjustment of Zhuzhou in 1997, the East District was dissolved, the subdistrict was transferred to Yuetang District formed in the year.

== Subdivisions ==
14 communities

- Changzheng (Chinese: 长征社区)
- Heyetang (Chinese: 荷叶塘社区)
- Hongqi (Chinese: 红旗村社区)
- Hongqilu (Chinese: 红旗路社区)
- Huangjiatang (Chinese: 黄家塘社区)
- Liulingyi (Chinese: 六0一社区)
- Manyuan (Chinese: 麻园社区)
- Qianjin (Chinese: 前进社区)
- Qichecheng (Chinese: 汽车城社区)
- Shangyuetang (Chinese: 上月塘社区)
- Tian'e (Chinese: 天鹅社区)
- Xinyuetang (Chinese: 新月塘社区)
- Yujiachong (Chinese: 余家冲社区)
- Zuanshi (Chinese: 钻石社区)
