= Yuetang Subdistrict =

Subdistrict in Hunan, China

Coordinates: 27°50′41″N 113°9′58″E

Yuetang Subdistrict (Chinese: 月塘街道; pinyin: Yuètáng Jiēdào) is a subdistrict of Hetang District in Zhuzhou, Hunan, China. It has an area of 6.33 km^{2} (2.44 sq mi) with a population of 47,000 (as of 2017). The town has a village and 7 communities under its jurisdiction. Its seat is at Wenhua Road (Chinese: 文化路)

== History ==
The subdistrict of Yuetang was formed in 1969, it was originally a subdistrict of East District (Chinese: 东区) in Zhuzhou. Through the district adjustment of Zhuzhou in 1997, the East District was dissolved, the subdistrict was transferred to Yuetang District formed in the year.

The Hetang District adjusted its administrative divisions in 2001, the subdistrict of Yuetang had 9 communities under its jurisdiction in 2004. Hetangpu Village was merged to the subdistrict from Jinshan Subdistrict in 2017.

== Subdivisions ==
a village

- Hetangpu Village (Chinese: 荷塘铺村)

7 villages

- Donghuan Community (Chinese: 东环社区)
- Nanyueling Community (Chinese: 南岳岭社区)
- Shitangchong Community (Chinese: 石塘冲社区)
- Shizitou Community (Chinese: 石子头社区)
- Shuizhu Community (Chinese: 水竹社区)
- Yeyachong Community (Chinese: 野鸭冲社区)
- Yuanjiawan Community (Chinese: 袁家湾社区)
