= Juan de Dios Guevara =

Peruvian chemist (1910–2000)

- Born: 1 March 1910; Pisco, Ica Region, Peru
- Died: 6 May 2000 (aged 90); Lima, Peru
- Other names: Juan de Dios Guevara Romero
- Known for: President of the Chemical Society of Peru (1962–1963; 1980–1983); President of the National Council of Universities of Peru (1971–1977)
- Awards: Cross of the Order of King Alfonso X
- Scientific career
- Institutions: National University of San Marcos

Juan de Dios Guevara Romero (1 March 1910 – 6 May 2000) was a Peruvian chemist. He received numerous awards, including the Cross of the Order of King Alfonso X from the Spanish government.

== Biography ==
In 1931, Guevara joined the Faculty of Sciences of the National University of San Marcos, but in 1932 studied at the School of Chemistry and Pharmacy of Peru.

He entered teaching in 1936 as Assistant Professor of Analytical Chemistry and was appointed as a senior lecturer at the National University of San Marcos. Then he was elected dean of its faculty for two consecutive terms.

Juan de Dios Guevara never dissociated himself from San Marcos and became rector in November 1966, a position he held until October 1977. Another important position he took was the president of the National Council of Universities of Peru (CONUP) (1971–1977).

Initially he worked in the analytical laboratories of the Peruvian Corporation in 1937–1942; later he took charge of production in the Maldonado Laboratories, retiring after more than twenty years. San Marcos university recognised his work by making him a Professor Emeritus.

The scientific contributions of Dr. Guevara have been published in the magazines "Farmacia Peruana", "Boletín de la Sociedad Química del Perú" and "Boletín de Informaciones de Química Aplicada".

Among his outstanding articles are La química inorgánica y la nomenclatura moderna, El contenido de flúor en las aguas de consumo de la República del Perú, Historia de la Sociedad Química del Perú and Restos de cocina dejado por precolombinos que habitaron la costa peruana. He also contributed to books on organic chemistry, some of which are used on university courses in Chile.

Guevara was President of the Chemical Society of Peru, between 1962–1963 and 1980–1983, having organised in the first year the Latin American Chemistry Congress, held in Lima.

Juan de Dios Guevara received numerous awards, including the Cross of the Order of King Alfonso X from the Spanish government.
