= Joy General Aviation Flight 6005 =

2016 aviation incident in China

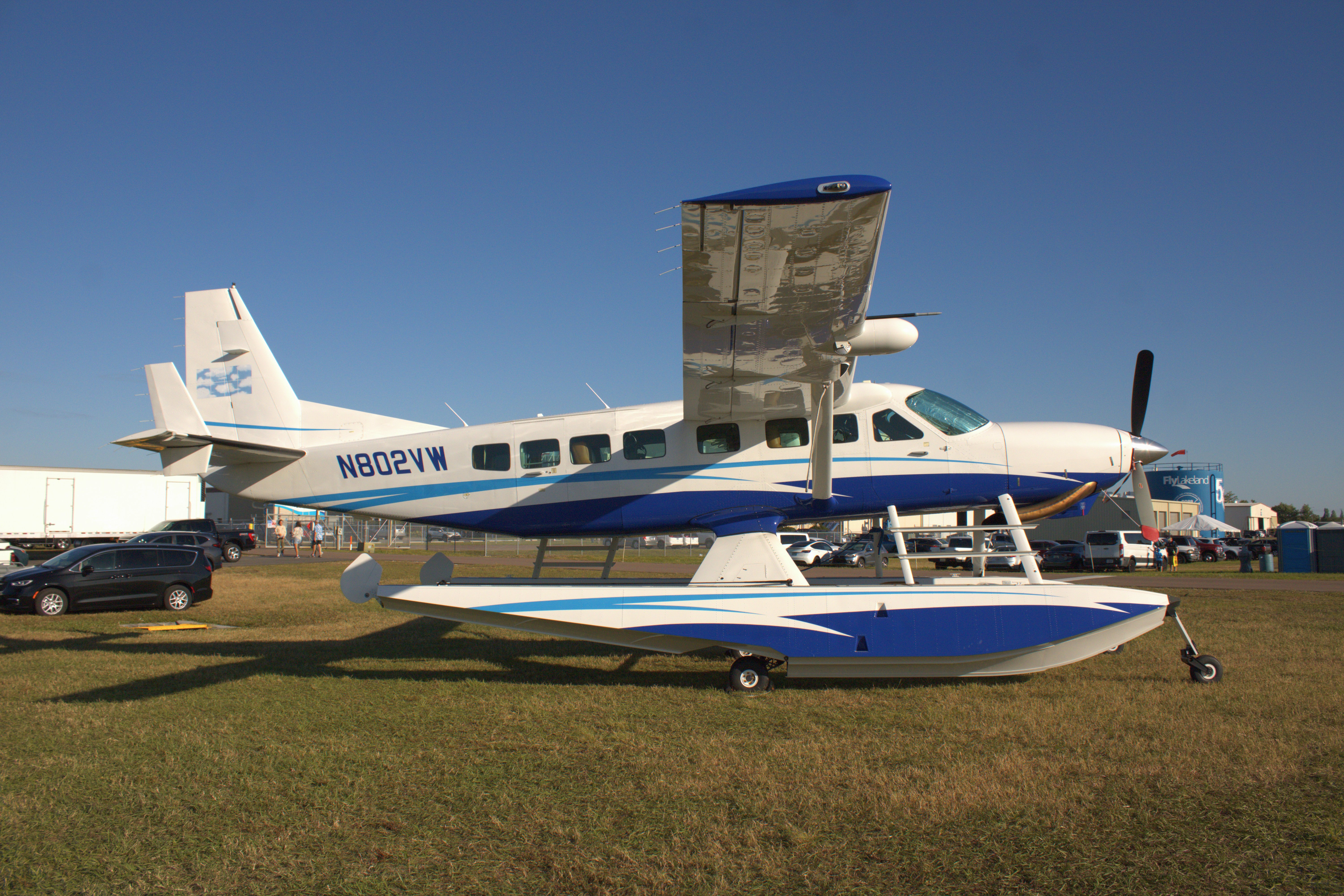
- A Cessna 208B similar to the one involved

Accident
- Date: 20 July 2016
- Summary: Crashed shortly after takeoff due to pilot error
- Site: near Shanghai Jinshan Floating Airport, Jinshan, Shanghai, China

Aircraft
- Aircraft type: Cessna 208B Caravan
- Aircraft name: Happiness
- Operator: Joy General Aviation
- IATA flight No.: JGA6005
- Registration: B-10FW
- Flight origin: Shanghai Jinshan Floating Airport, Jinshan, Shanghai, China
- Destination: Zhoushan Putuoshan International Airport, Zhoushan, Zhejiang, China
- Occupants: 10
- Passengers: 8
- Crew: 2
- Fatalities: 5
- Injuries: 5
- Survivors: 5

Joy General Aviation Flight 6005 (JGA6005) was a charter flight from Jinshan, Shanghai to Zhoushan, China. On 20 July 2016, the aircraft collided with No. 7385 bridge on the Shanghai-Hangzhou Highway. The first officer and four passengers were killed, with 5 other occupants suffering injuries.

== Aircraft and crew ==
The aircraft involved was a Cessna 208B Caravan Amphibian, registration B-10FW (serial no. 5222), nicknamed "Happiness" (after the company name), manufactured in 2015. It was operated by Joy General Aviation based in Zhejiang, China. The crew consisted of captain Zhang Fuquan and first officer Bian Jiang.

== Accident ==
At 12:19, the plane took off from Jinshan Airport. Moments later, the plane suddenly climbed sharply and turned left. According to one of the surviving passengers, Wu Liangliang, a reporter of the Chinese news company KNews, one of the pilots shouted, "Bridge!" shortly before impact. The aircraft then impacted the No. 7385 bridge at 12:20 pm, linking the cities of Shanghai and Hangzhou, China.

== Investigation ==
Shortly after the crash, the airline was ordered to suspend all flight activities. The flight recorders were recovered and sent for analysis. The Civil Aviation Administration of China opened an investigation into the cause of the crash. Mechanical failure was quickly ruled out, with investigators concluding that the aircraft was in good working order and was airworthy. The Civil Aviation Administration of China concluded that pilot error was the cause of the crash, with the captain not following instructions and had taken off 395 meters past the end of the runway.

== Aftermath ==
The captain of the accident flight had his pilots license revoked for six months following the crash. In September, Zhou Hua, the chief pilot of Joy General Aviation, as well as the captain, were both included in the "blacklist" of untrustworthy personnel.

This accident prompted the Civil Aviation Administration to revise the "Rules for the Qualification Assessment of Commercial Aircraft Operators of Small Aircraft", which increased the minimum number of flight hours required for flight crews operating under visual flight rules from 500 hours to 800 hours.
