= Gold Mountain =

Gold Mountain and similar may refer to:

- Gold Mountain (toponym), a historical Chinese name for gold-producing regions in California, British Columbia, and Australia
- Gold Mountain (Washington), a mountain in Kitsap County, Washington
- Gold Mountain, California, a community in California
- Gold Mountain Range, a mountain range in Nevada
- Gold Mountain Records, a record label
- Gold Mountain (film), an upcoming film directed by Ang Lee

== See also ==
- Kingsoft, a Chinese software company whose Chinese name means "Gold Mountain"
- 金山 (disambiguation), (Cantonese: Gāmsāan, 金山), the Cantonese name for Gold Mountain
