= Jinshan Subdistrict, Zhuzhou =

Subdistrict of Zhuzhou, Hunan, China

Jinshan Subdistrict (Chinese: 金山街道; pinyin: Jīnshān Jiēdào) is a subdistrict of Hetang District in Zhuzhou, Hunan, China. It has an area of 21.95 km^{2} (8.47 sq mi) with a population of 49,300 (as of 2017). The subdistrict has 4 villages and 3 communities under its jurisdiction. Its seat is Jingoushan Village (Chinese: 金钩山村).

== History ==
The subdistrict of Jinshan was formed in 2005. In the year of 2005, Hetangpu (Chinese: 荷塘铺乡) ceased to be a separate township, it was divided to the three subdistricts of Jinshan, Songjiaqiao and Guihua. Three villages of Jingoushan, Taiyang and Hetangpu of Hetangpu Township and three communities of Jingoushan, Yanjiawan and Xianghua of Songjiaqiao Subdistrict were transferred to the subdistrict of Jinshan, Jinshan had an area of 10.2 km^{2} (3.9 sq mi) with a population of 24,823 in 2005.

In 2017, Hetangpu Village (Chinese: 荷塘铺村) was transferred to Yuetang Subdistrict, two villages of Xinshi and Tongziping of Xianyu Town were transferred to it, it has an area of 21.95 km^{2} (8.47 sq mi) with a population of 49,300 (as of 2017).

== Subdivisions ==
4 villages

- Jinggoushan Village (Chinese: 金钩山村)
- Taiyang Village (Chinese: 太阳村)
- Tongziping Village (Chinese: 桐梓坪村)
- Xinshi Village (Chinese: 新市村)

3 communities

- Liufang Community (Chinese: 流芳社区)
- Xianghua Community (Chinese: 湘华社区)
- Yanjiawan Community (Chinese: 晏家湾社区)
