= Xiaojinshan (Yangzhou) =

Island in Slender West Lake in Yangzhou, Jiangsu, China

Xiaojinshan 小金山
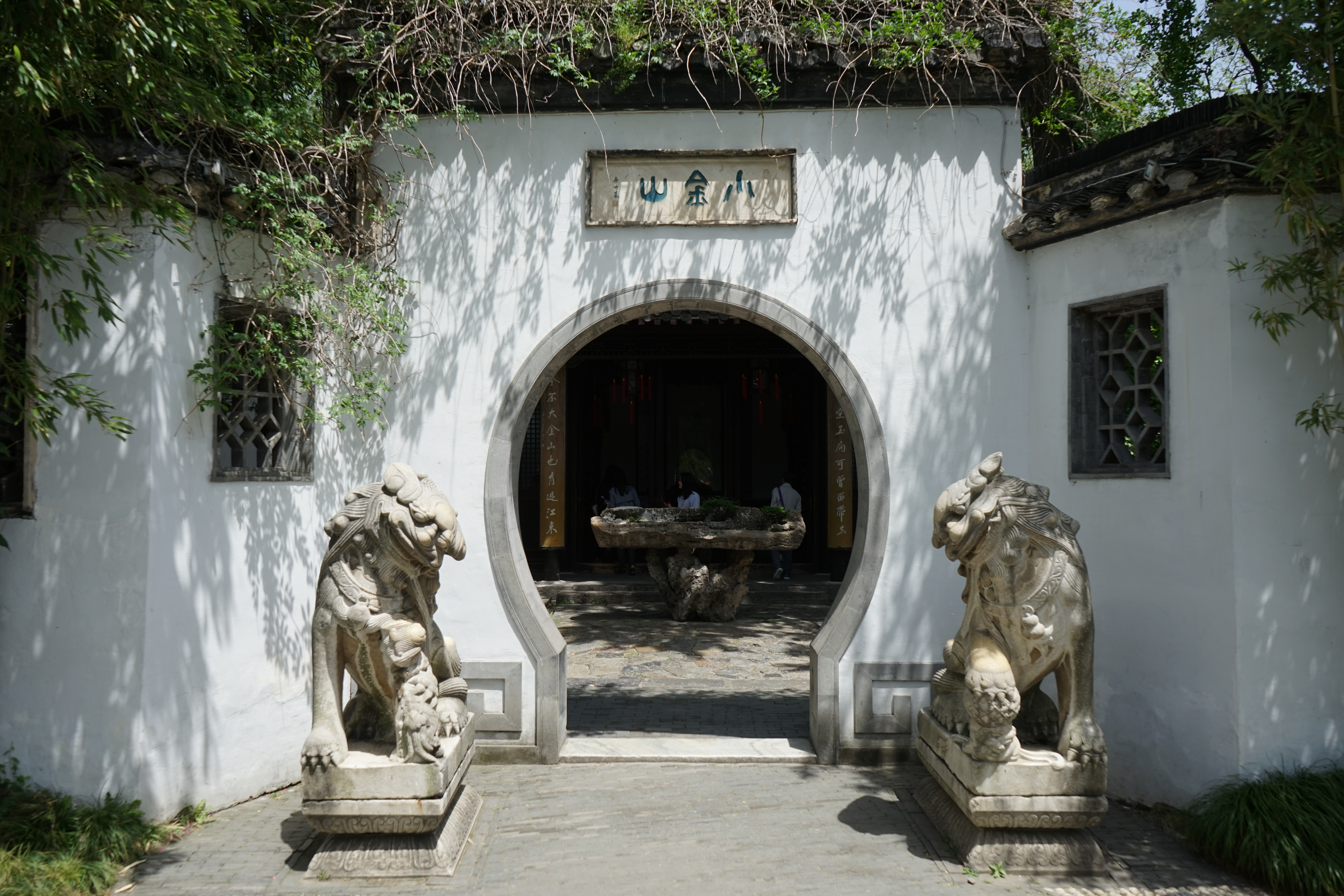
- Entrance, guarded by foo dogs
- Interactive map of Xiaojinshan 小金山

Geography
- Location: Slender West Lake
- Coordinates: 32°24′36″N 119°25′12″E

Administration
- China

Xiaojinshan
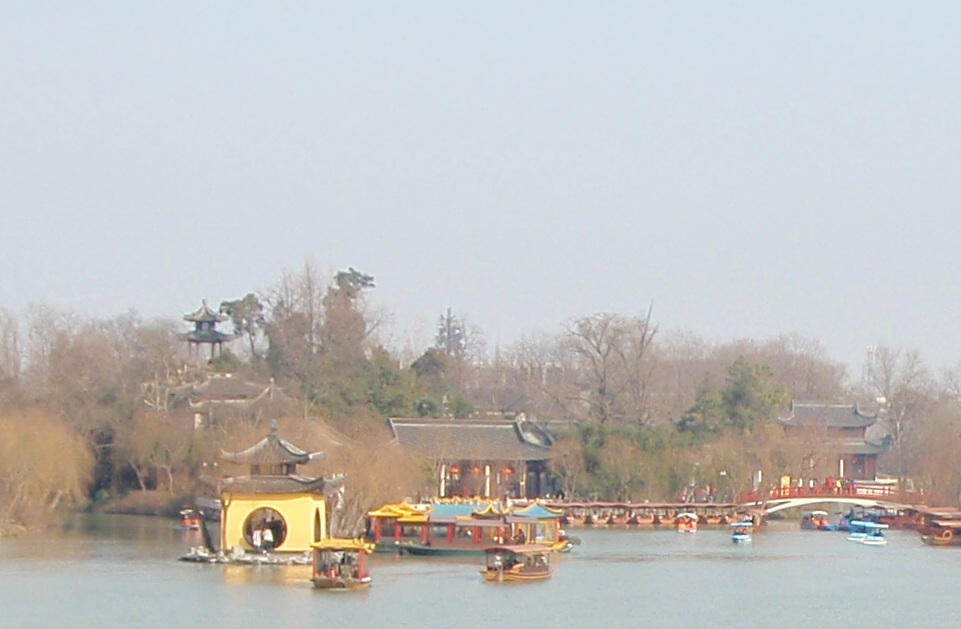
- Xiaojinshan during Chinese New Year, 2009
- Chinese: 小金山
- Literal meaning: Little/Lesser Gold Mountain, Hill, or Island
Transcriptions
Standard Mandarin
- Hanyu Pinyin: Xiǎojīnshān
- Wade–Giles: Hsiao-chin-shan

Former names
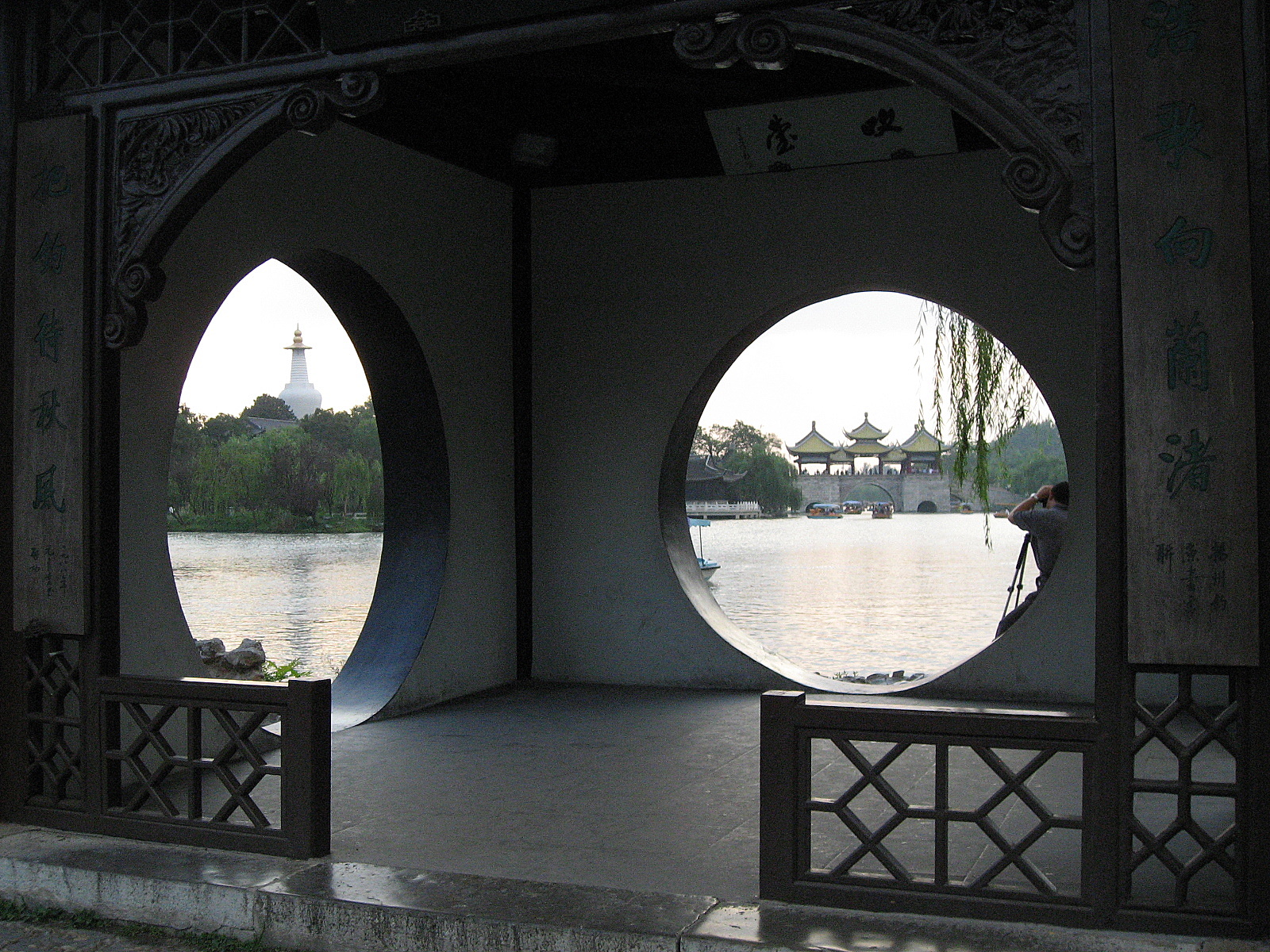
- The view of the White Dagoba and Five-Pavilion Bridge framed by the moon gates of the Fishing Terrace on Xiaojinshan

Changchun Island
- Traditional Chinese: 長春嶺
- Simplified Chinese: 长春岭
- Literal meaning: Long Spring Peak
Transcriptions
Standard Mandarin
- Hanyu Pinyin: Chángchūnlǐng
- Wade–Giles: Ch'ang-ch'un-ling

Xiaojinshan is a small island in Slender West Lake just west of central Yangzhou, Jiangsu, in eastern China. Pedestrian bridges connect it north and south to the banks of the lake.

== Name ==
Xiaojinshan is the atonal pinyin romanization of the island's Chinese name 小金山. Although 山 in this context actually means "island", the official translation of the name is "Little Golden Hill". The island was formerly known in Chinese as Changchunling (長春嶺/长春岭), the "Peak of Long-Lasting Spring".

== History ==
Xiaojinshan was formed in 1757 from the material removed while dredging the Slender West Lake into its current shape in preparation for the second southern inspection tour of the Qianlong Emperor of the Qing dynasty.

Xiaojinshan was inscribed as the 10th Cultural Heritage Site under Municipal-Level Protection during the 3rd round of Yangzhou's nominations.

== Geography ==
Xiaojinshan is the largest islet in Yangzhou's Slender West Lake.

== Components ==
The garden on the island has long been covered with plum trees, forming the "Plum Ridge in the Spring Twilight" (t 梅嶺春深, s 梅岭春深, Méilǐng Chūnshēn) reckoned as one of the 24 Views of Yangzhou under the Qing. It also includes a number of separate features including the Wind Pavilion (t 風亭, s 风亭, Fēngtíng), the Moon-Viewing Pavilion (月观, Yuèguān), and the Harp Chamber (琴室, Qínshì).

The most famous is the Fishing Terrace (t 釣魚台, s 钓鱼台, Diàoyútái), formally the Blowing Terrace (吹台, Chuītái), at the end of a long spit at the island's western extremity. From its entrance, its moon gates frame the Lianxing Temple's dagoba and the Five-Pavilion Bridge across the lake to the west. It was a favorite spot of the Qianlong Emperor.

== See also ==
- Islands of China
