= Gold Mountain Range =

Mountain range in Nevada, United States

- Location within Nevada

Highest point
- Elevation: 1,816 m (5,958 ft)

Geography
- Country: United States
- State: Nevada
- District: Esmeralda County
- Range coordinates: 37°11′40.749″N 117°18′54.262″W
- Topo map: USGS Gold Mountain

The Gold Mountain Range is a mountain range in Esmeralda County, Nevada.

== See also ==
- Gold Mountain
