= 2011 Moremi Air Cessna 208 crash =

Air accident in Botswana

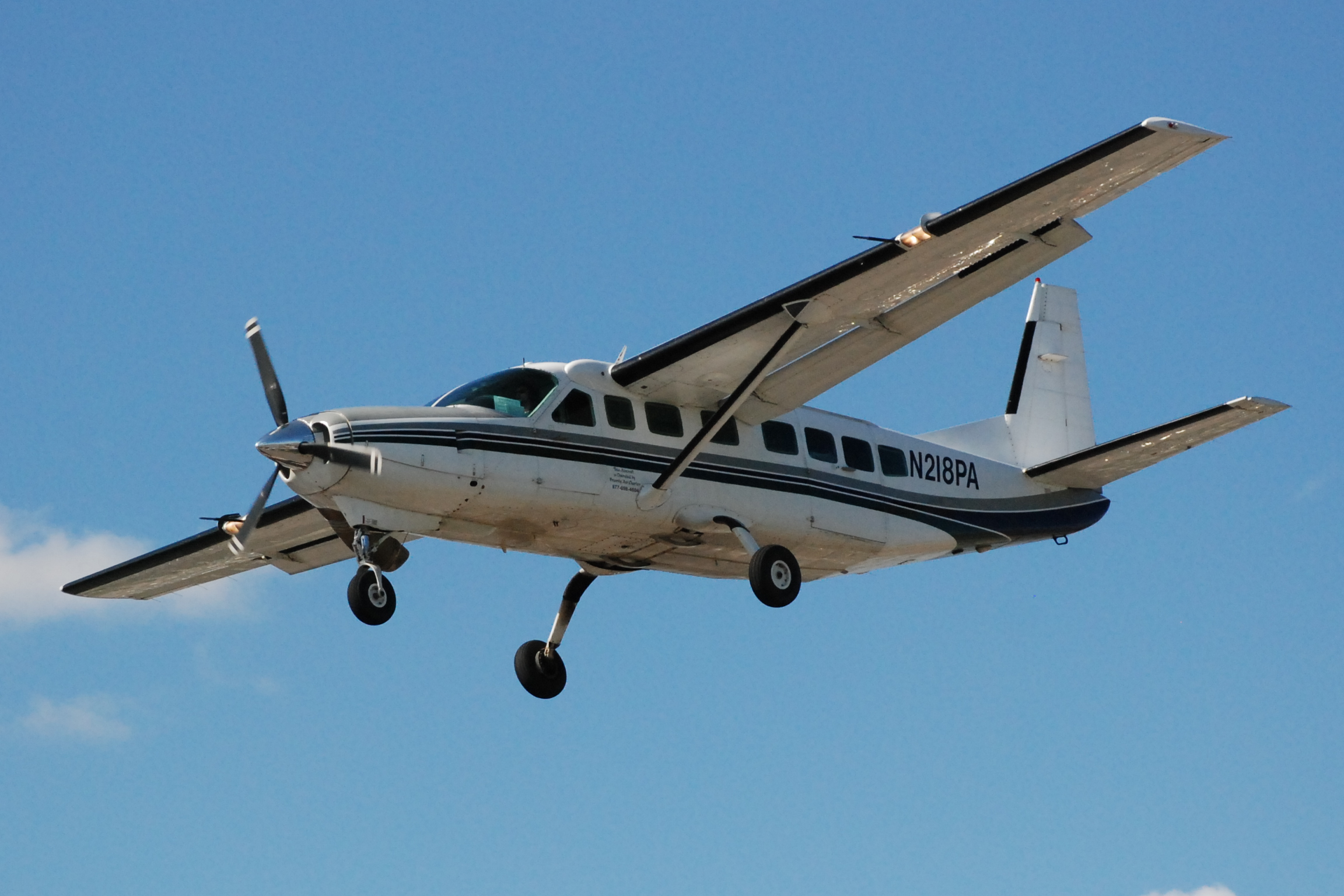
- A Cessna 208 Caravan similar to the one involved

Accident
- Date: 14 October 2011
- Summary: Engine failure on take-off
- Site: Near Xakanaka camp, Botswana; 19.200°S 23.427°E

Aircraft
- Aircraft type: Cessna 208B Grand Caravan
- Operator: Moremi Air
- Registration: A2-AKD
- Flight origin: Maun Airport, Maun, Botswana
- 1st stopover: Xakanaka Camp, Botswana
- 2nd stopover: Pom Pom Camp, Botswana
- Destination: Maun Airport
- Occupants: 12
- Passengers: 11
- Crew: 1
- Fatalities: 8
- Injuries: 4
- Survivors: 4

On 14 October 2011, a Cessna 208 Caravan turboprop passenger aircraft operated by Moremi Air on a domestic flight from Xakanaka Camp to Maun, Botswana, crashed and caught fire shortly after take-off, killing eight of the twelve people on board.

The following investigation concluded that the aircraft suffered a catastrophic engine failure on take-off, compounded by environmental hazards at Xakanaka, which led to the plane hitting trees and crashing to the ground.

== History of the flight ==
The aircraft had departed from Maun Airport on the morning of 14 October for a series of flight sectors in the Okavango Delta that took it to Kasane Airport. After refuelling there, at 11:50 eleven passengers boarded the aircraft. The next flight would have taken the Cessna aircraft to Pom Pom Camp, but it was decided to stop at Xakanaxa first to drop off two passengers. No flight plan was filed for the diversion to Xakanaxa, nor was the airline's base informed.

At Xakanaxa, the pilot was informed that he was required to pick up another two passengers bound for Maun. After some hesitation, the pilot agreed to take the passengers, departing from Xakanaxa with eleven passengers, despite company procedures restricting the maximum number of passengers for operations from that airfield to ten.

The Grand Caravan aircraft took off from Xakanaka Airstrip at 13:55. Almost immediately after take-off, the engine lost power and the aircraft collided with trees. It then crashed nose first approximately 600 metres from the airfield, with an intense fire quickly engulfing the wreckage, burning beyond recognition the bodies of six passengers and the pilot. A rescue team was flown in and found the wreckage still ablaze. An eighth occupant was taken to hospital but later died. Identification of the victims was only possible through DNA testing.

== Aircraft ==
The airplane involved was a Cessna 208B Grand Caravan, a single-engine turboprop utility aircraft capable of carrying thirteen passengers plus crew. It was fitted with a Pratt & Whitney Canada PT6A-114A turboprop engine. It held Botswanan registration A2-AKD, and had been manufactured in 1996.

== Passengers and crew ==
The Grand Caravan was crewed by a single pilot and was carrying eleven passengers. The passengers were mainly French and Swiss tourists heading for a safari lodge, but also included two Botswanan officials from the country's Department of Road Transport, who both survived. Some of the Swiss passengers were initially misidentified as Swedish. The pilot was Moremi Air's general manager, and was described as the company's "most seasoned pilot" with over 12,000 flight hours.

Nationality	Passengers	Crew	Fatalities
France	4	0	2
United Kingdom	1	1	2
Switzerland	4	0	4
Botswana	2	0	0
Total	11	1	8

== Investigation ==
The investigation into the crash was carried out by the Directorate of Accident Investigation (DAI) of the Botswanan Ministry of Transport and Communications. Its results were published in June 2013.

The main cause of the accident was found to be "engine failure resulting from the failure of the Compressor Turbine Blades." (Note: In a free-turbine engine such as the PT6A, the compressor turbine is the turbine that drives the compressor, as opposed to the power turbine, which is separate and drives the propeller.) Turbine blades were found to be affected by "sulphidation corrosion", although it could not be established whether that was the root cause of the failure, leaving open the possibility that material failure or inappropriate engine operation may have played a role.

The report was also very critical of Moremi Air's management style and training practices, concluding that the company's safety culture "had eroded to the extent that safety was being compromised." Other contributing factors cited were the presence of tall trees in the vicinity of the runway at Xakanaxa, the decision to embark more passengers than the maximum allowed for operations at that airfield, poor supervision of operators and airfields by the Civil Aviation Authority of Botswana (CAAB), and the engine manufacturer's failure to disseminate "critical maintenance information" among operators.

The DAI made several safety recommendations to the CAAB calling for stricter supervision of airline and airfield operators, and to Cessna, the aircraft manufacturer, to ensure that the aircraft data acquisition system (ADAS) is made to resist fire damage.
