= Georgian Express Flight 126 =

Aviation accident in 2004

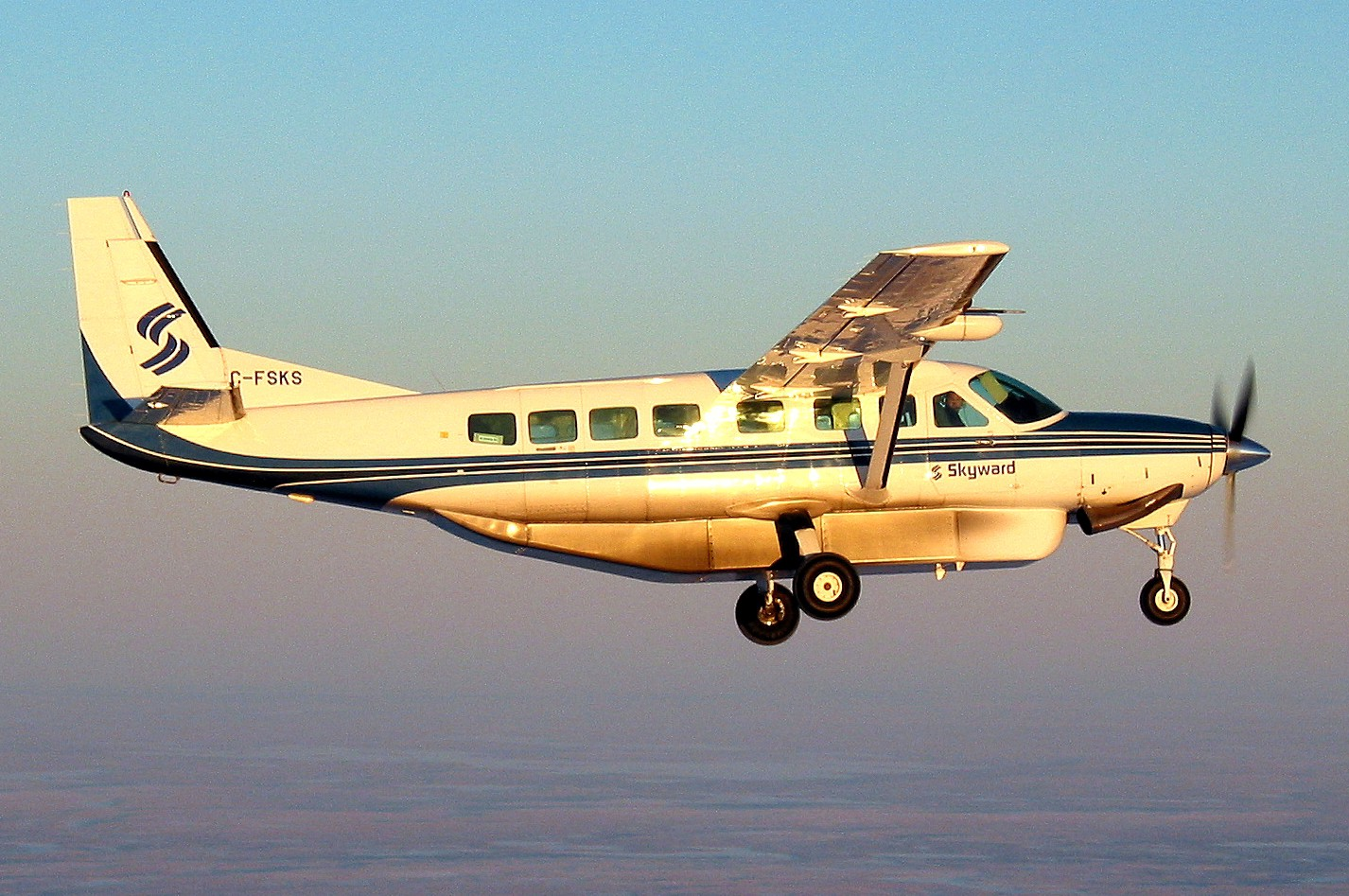
- An Cessna 208B Grand Caravan similar to the one involved in the accident

Accident
- Date: January 17, 2004
- Summary: Crashed shortly after takeoff due to icing and overloading
- Site: Lake Erie, 3 km north west of Pelee Island Airport, Canada

Aircraft
- Aircraft type: Cessna 208B Grand Caravan
- Operator: Georgian Express
- Registration: C-FAGA
- Flight origin: Pelee Island Airport
- Destination: Windsor International Airport
- Occupants: 10
- Passengers: 9
- Crew: 1
- Fatalities: 10
- Survivors: 0

Georgian Express Flight 126 was a scheduled domestic flight from Pelee Island to Windsor, Ontario. On January 17, 2004 the Cessna 208B Grand Caravan crashed after takeoff due to icing and overloading, killing all ten people on board.

== Background ==
=== Aircraft ===
The involved aircraft was a Cessna 208B Grand Caravan built in 1990 registered as C-FAGA to the Canadian airline Georgian Express. It had 7,809 flight hours at the time of the accident.

=== Passengers and crew ===
Nine passengers boarded Flight 126. The pilot was the only crew member on board. He had flown as a first officer with Georgian Express (then a subsidiary of Air Georgian) since November 2000, initially on Beechcraft 1900s and later as a captain since 30 November 2003 on Cessna 208s.

=== Purpose of flight ===
Passenger service between Windsor and Pelee Island is normally provided by a ferry service operated by the Owen Sound Transportation Company (OSTC). During the winter months when Lake Erie is frozen, the company contracts with external service providers to operate air services. Georgian Express was awarded the contract for the 2003/04 winter season on December 13, 2003.

== Flight timeline ==
At 15:23 the aircraft was refueled at Windsor Airport, and at 15:55 it was de-iced, taking off ten minutes later for Pelee. Twenty-five minutes later it landed at Pelee Island Airport. Before taking off from Pelee for the return trip, two people on the ramp expressed their concern about ice on the wings to the pilot. The pilot was then observed inspecting the wings, but expressed no concern and continued boarding the passengers and loading the cargo. At approximately 16:38, the aircraft took off as GGN126 for Windsor. After having taken off using most of the runway, the Cessna climbed into the air at a very shallow angle. As the pilot raised the flaps over Lake Erie while attempting to land, a stall occurred. Because the aircraft was entering a right turn at this point, the stall first occurred on the left wing. The nose dipped, and the Cessna rolled to the left and eventually impacted the ice, killing all ten occupants.

== Aftermath ==
The family of Robert Brisco, a passenger who was killed in the crash, sued both Georgian Express and Owen Sound Transportation in 2019 for monetary damages and punitive damages after they had previously admitted liability.

== Investigation ==
The investigation by the Transportation Safety Board of Canada found that the aircraft was operable, but about 15 percent overweight at the time of departure. The Board determined that standard passenger weight values were to be updated and that commercial and air taxi aircraft with nine or fewer passengers should use real passenger weights instead of standard ones so as not to underestimate their weight. Additionally, an Ontario jury found the pilot at fault for the crash and awarded the family of a victim $345,000.
