= Sarah Roberts (subject of vampire legend) =

Englishwoman said to be a vampire in Peru

Sarah Ellen Roberts (née Gargett, 6 March 1872 – 9 June 1913) was an Englishwoman who died and was buried in Pisco, Peru. After her death, a legend evolved that she was a vampire and bride of Dracula. On 9 June 1993, the 80th anniversary of her death, locals in Pisco feared she would come back to life and take her revenge.

== Early life and family ==
Roberts was one of four children born to William Gargett, a coachman, and Catherine Abbott, who married in Yorkshire in 1864. She was born in Burnley in 1872, and in 1881 the family was living in Blackburn. Sarah married John Pryce Roberts in St. John’s Church, Blackburn, on 1 March 1892. The 1901 United Kingdom census recorded that Sarah and John were weavers and had two children, Frank, born 1892, and William, born 1893.

In 1901, John Roberts’s younger brother Thomas left his job as the manager of a weaving mill to take up a similar position in Lima, Peru. John went to Peru at least twice, and again in late 1912 or early 1913, taking Sarah with him and leaving their children in England.

Sarah died on 9 June 1913 in Pisco, Peru. Her cause of death is not known. An announcement of her death appeared in the obituary column of the Northern Daily Telegraph:

Roberts:--On the 9th inst., at Pisco, Peru, Sarah Ellen, the beloved wife of John P. Roberts (formerly of 25 Isherwood-street, Blackburn.) In her 42nd year. Deeply regretted.

Sarah was buried in Pisco. Her headstone reads:

In memory of Sarah Ellen the beloved wife of J. Roberts of Blackburn, England. Born March 6 - 1872 and died June 9th 1913 At rest

John Roberts returned to England and opened a grocer's shop, which he ran until his death in October 1925.

== Vampire legend ==
After Roberts's death, a legend evolved in Peru that she was a vampire. There were many versions of the legend. According to one, in June 1913 Roberts was sentenced to death in East Lancashire after being accused of being a witch, a vampire and a murderer. She was thrown, still alive, into a lead-lined coffin, and vowed to return for vengeance.

In another version of the legend, John Roberts travelled around Europe, but no country would allow him to bury Sarah because of her unholiness and promise of vengeance. He then travelled to South America, where he was turned away in Chile and Argentina. One day, a sailor told him take Sarah to Peru, as "everyone knows Peru is the land of witches.”

In another version, Sarah Roberts was one of three 'brides of Dracula', along with sisters Andrea and Erica, who were executed in Blackburn and buried by John Roberts in Mexico and Hungary or Panama.

In yet another version, she arrived in Peru, gave birth to a son and died six days later. Stories began circulating about a pale-faced foreign woman who stalked the town, feasting on the blood of animals and young children, who became known as the Vampira de Inglaterra.

On 9 June 1993, the 80th anniversary of Roberts's death, locals in Pisco feared she would come back to life and take her revenge. It was reported that hundreds of people bought anti-vampire kits, complete with stakes and garlic, before descending on her tombstone to throw holy water and pray and await the resurrection. Pregnant women fled, fearful that Roberts's spirit might try to reincarnate itself in their unborn child. Street vendors in Pisco's main square sold T-shirts and key rings carrying the picture of a vampire, and small bags with a crucifix and cloves of garlic to wear round the neck.

Television and radio stations broadcast live from the graveside, but Reuters news agency reported that Roberts "stayed peacefully in her coffin". Believers in the occult, however, warned that the spell was dormant and nobody was safe from "Mrs Dracula". Police dispersed the disappointed crowd, many of whom were self-styled vampire-hunters, armed with stakes and crucifixes. Local witchdoctors turned up to exorcise the tomb.

In August 2007, a massive earthquake struck Peru, killing hundreds and destroying a large part of the city. The cemetery was devastated but Roberts's grave was not damaged, which reinforced local beliefs of her power.

Blackburn historian Stephen Smith has debunked the myth, and said Roberts was an ordinary weaver from Burnley, and the worst that could have happened to her for practising witchcraft would have been a prison sentence. The Blackburn court could not have sentenced her to death.

The legend has been used to encourage tourism, such as an article in the Latin Post which encourages people to "Visit a Vampire Grave in Pisco". The Latin America for Less website says: "To this day, citizens claim to see a ghostly woman wander the town’s dusty streets at night. So when you go to Pisco for the famous drink, don’t forget to look for the Vampire of Pisco in this haunted destination!"

Writing in the Folklore journal, David Keyworth said:

No matter how hard we might try to belittle the notion of its existence, or ignore its many manifestations, the vampire belief would appear to be here to stay in the popular imagination, and to remain the stuff of nightmares.
