= Hetang, Zhuzhou =

Hetang 荷塘区
- District
- Location in Hunan
- Coordinates: 27°51′21″N 113°10′24″E
- Country: China
- Province: Hunan
- Prefecture-level city: Zhuzhou
- District seat: Guihua Subdistrict

Area
  - Total: 143 km^{2} (55 sq mi)

Population (2020 census)
  - Total: 348,894
  - Density: 2,440/km^{2} (6,320/sq mi)
- Time zone: UTC+8 (China Standard)
- Website: www.hetang.gov.cn

Hetang District (simplified Chinese: 荷塘区; traditional Chinese: 荷塘區; pinyin: Hétáng Qū) is one of four urban districts of Zhuzhou City, Hunan province, China.

As of 2015, it had a permanent resident population of 311,400. The government seat is at Guihua Subdistrict (桂花街道).

== Administrative divisions ==
As of June 2023, there are six subdistricts and one town under the jurisdiction of Hetang District. They are:

6 subdistricts

- Cigutang (茨菇塘街道)
- Guihua (桂花街道)
- Jinshan (金山街道)
- Songjiaqiao (宋家桥街道)
- Yuetang (月塘街道)
- Mingzhao (明照街道)

1 town

- Xianyu (仙庾镇)
