= Sarah T. Roberts (epidemiologist) =

American epidemiologist

Sarah T. Roberts is an American epidemiologist.

== Professional career ==
She is a research public health analyst specializing in “the biological, behavioral, social and structural factors that increase the risk of HIV/STI for women and girls in sub-Saharan Africa, particularly the role of gender inequality, male engagement, and intimate partner violence, and in the design of interventions to maximize uptake of and adherence to biomedical HIV prevention strategies in women.“

== Education ==
- PhD, Epidemiology, University of Washington
- MPH, Global Health, Emory University
- BA, Human Biology, Brown University
