= Pisco, Peru =

Pisco
- City
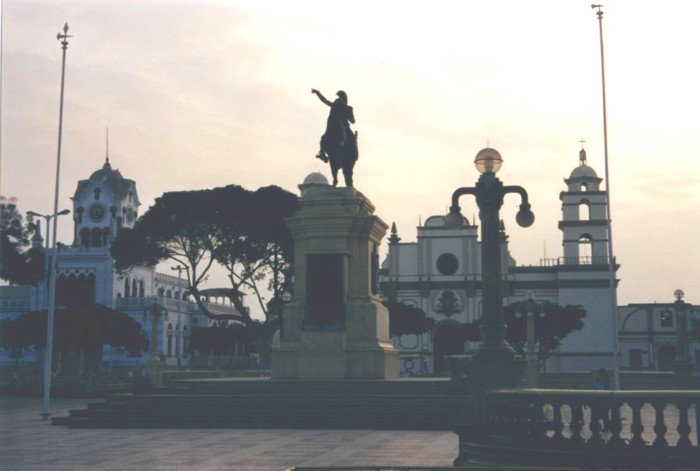
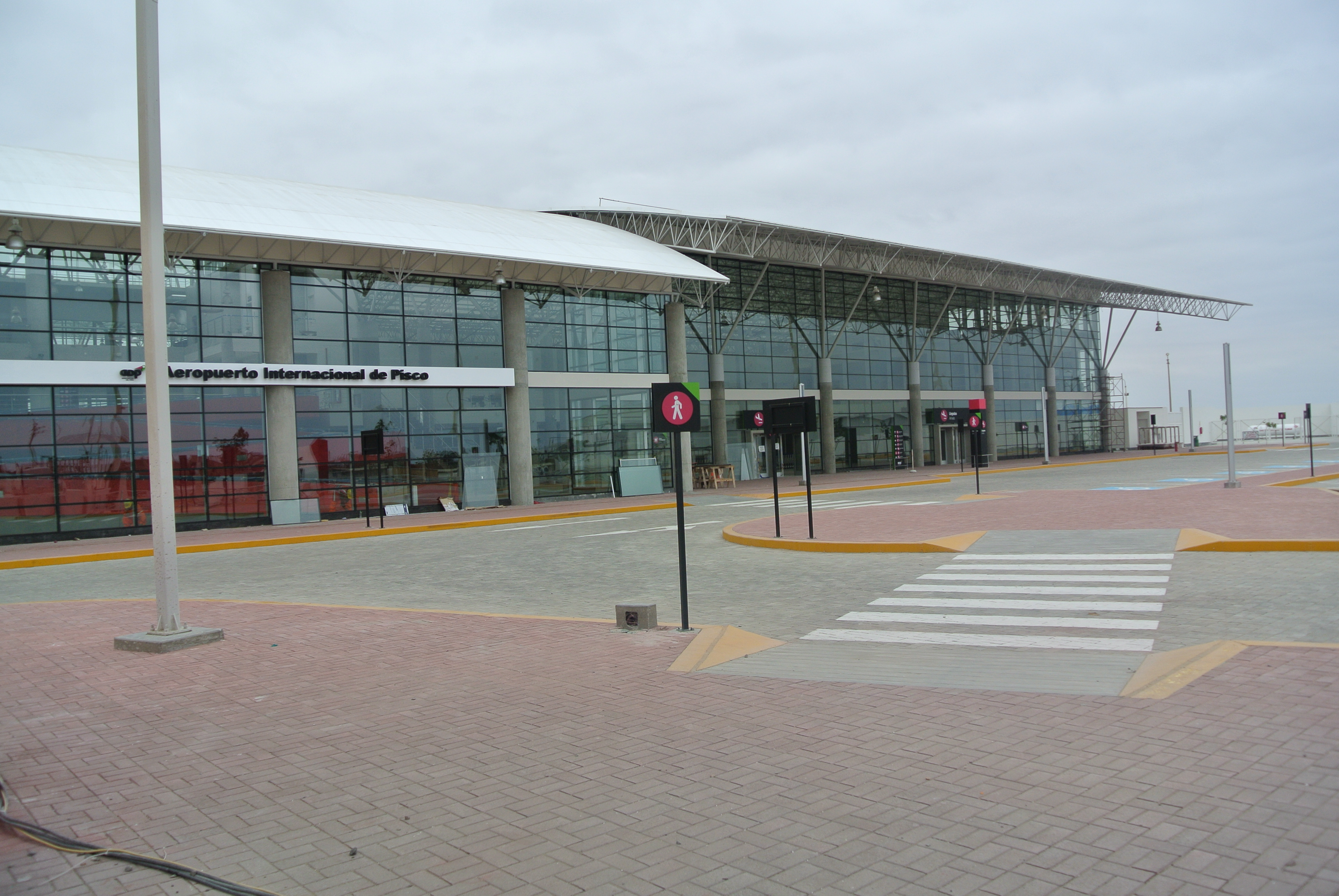
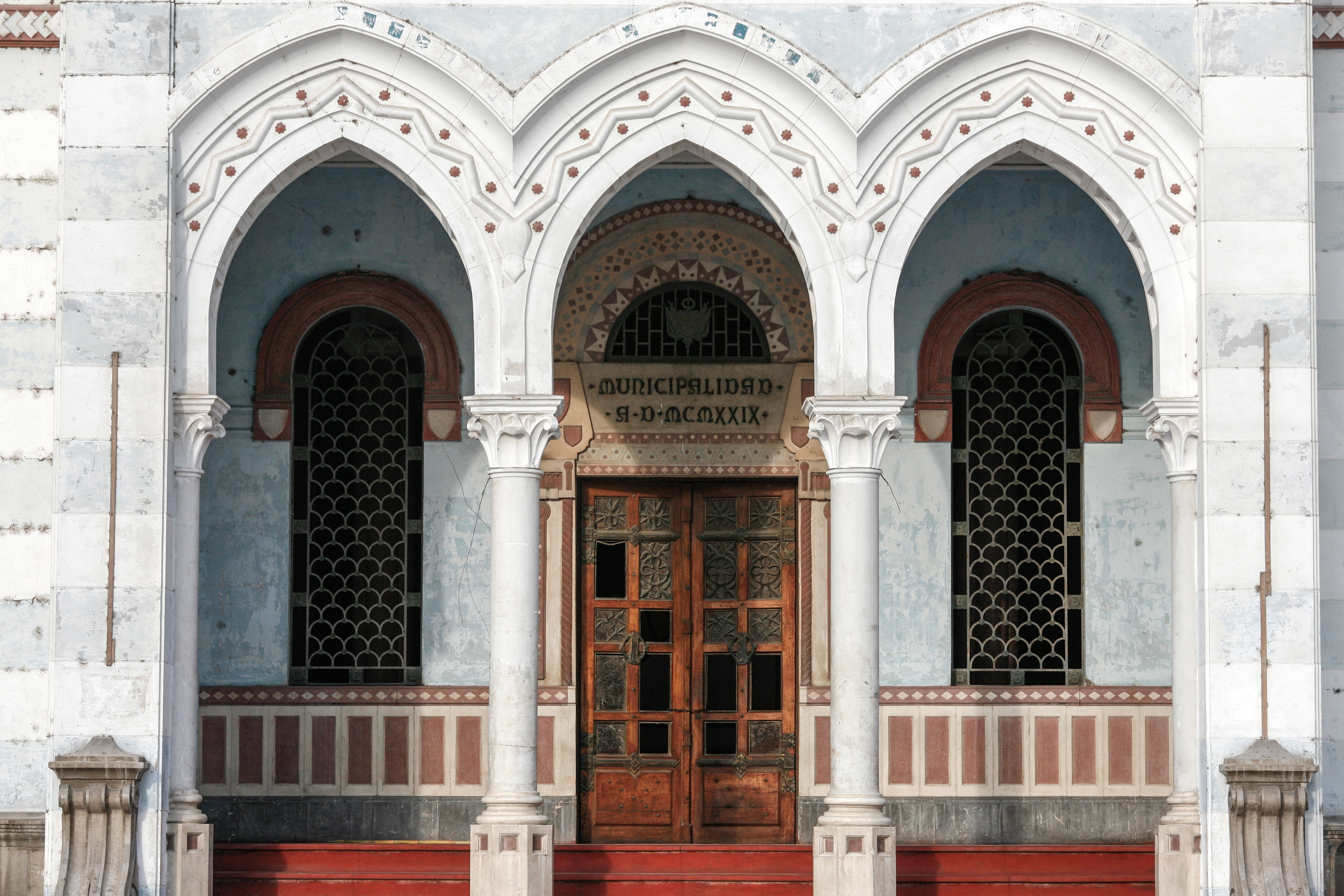
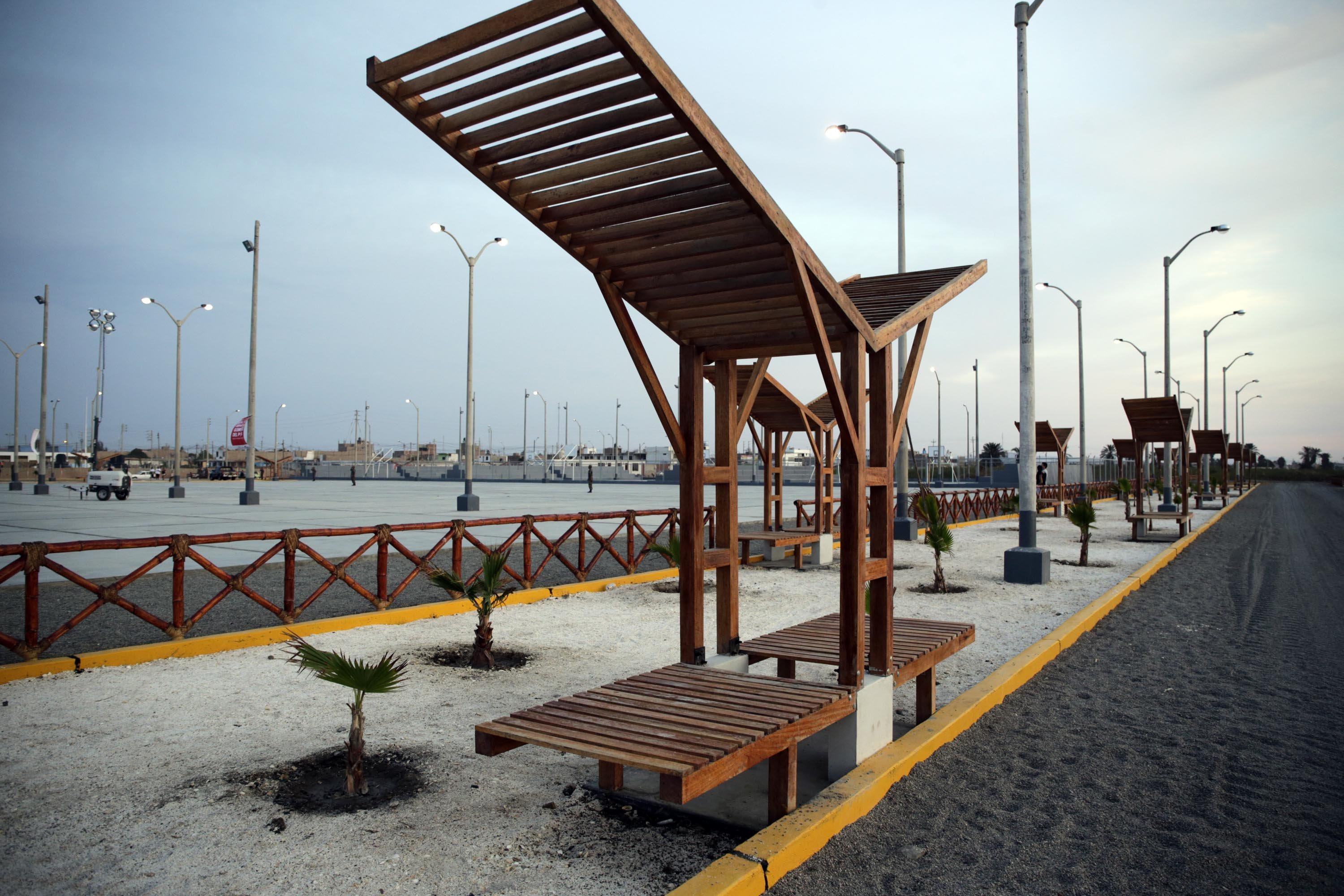
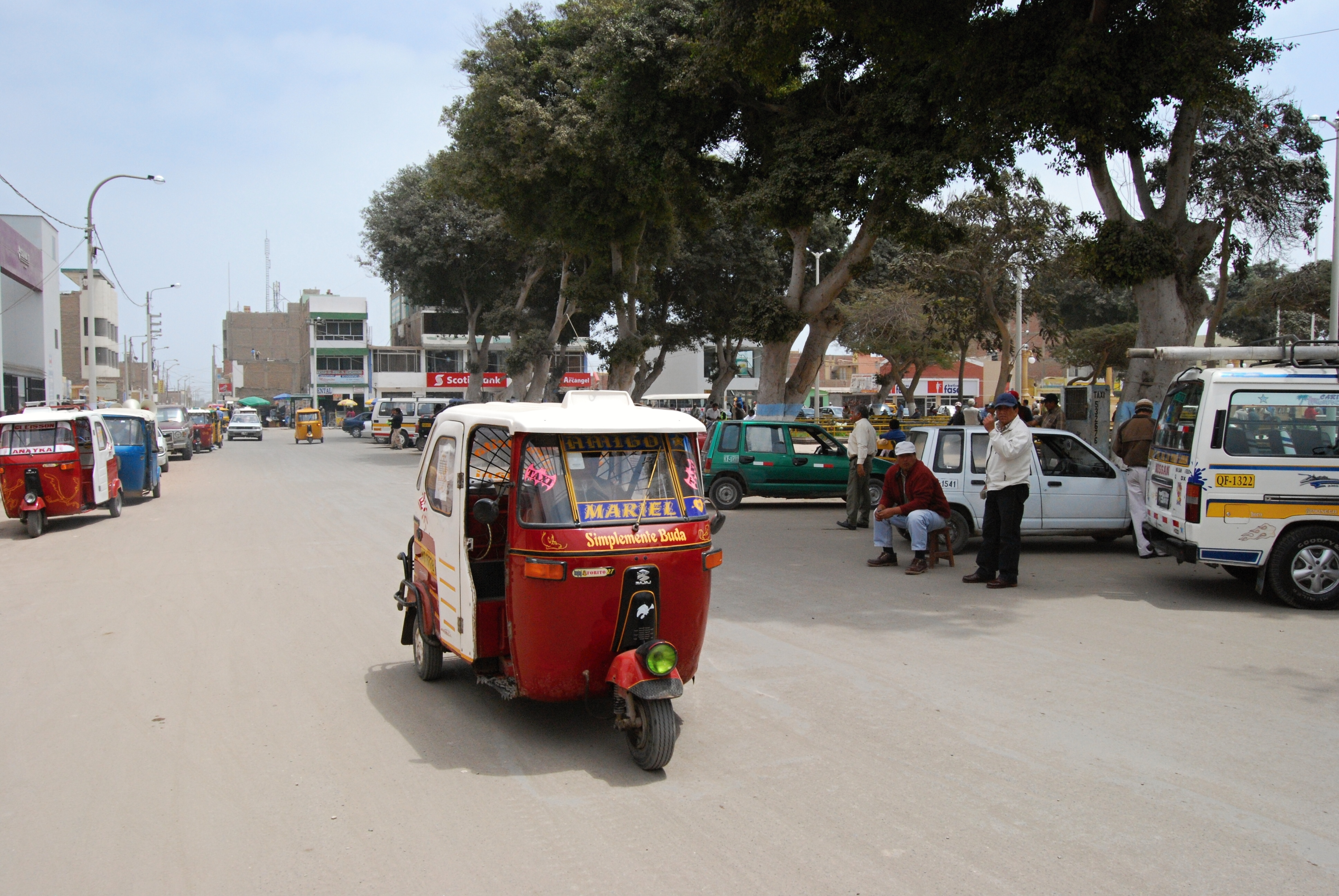
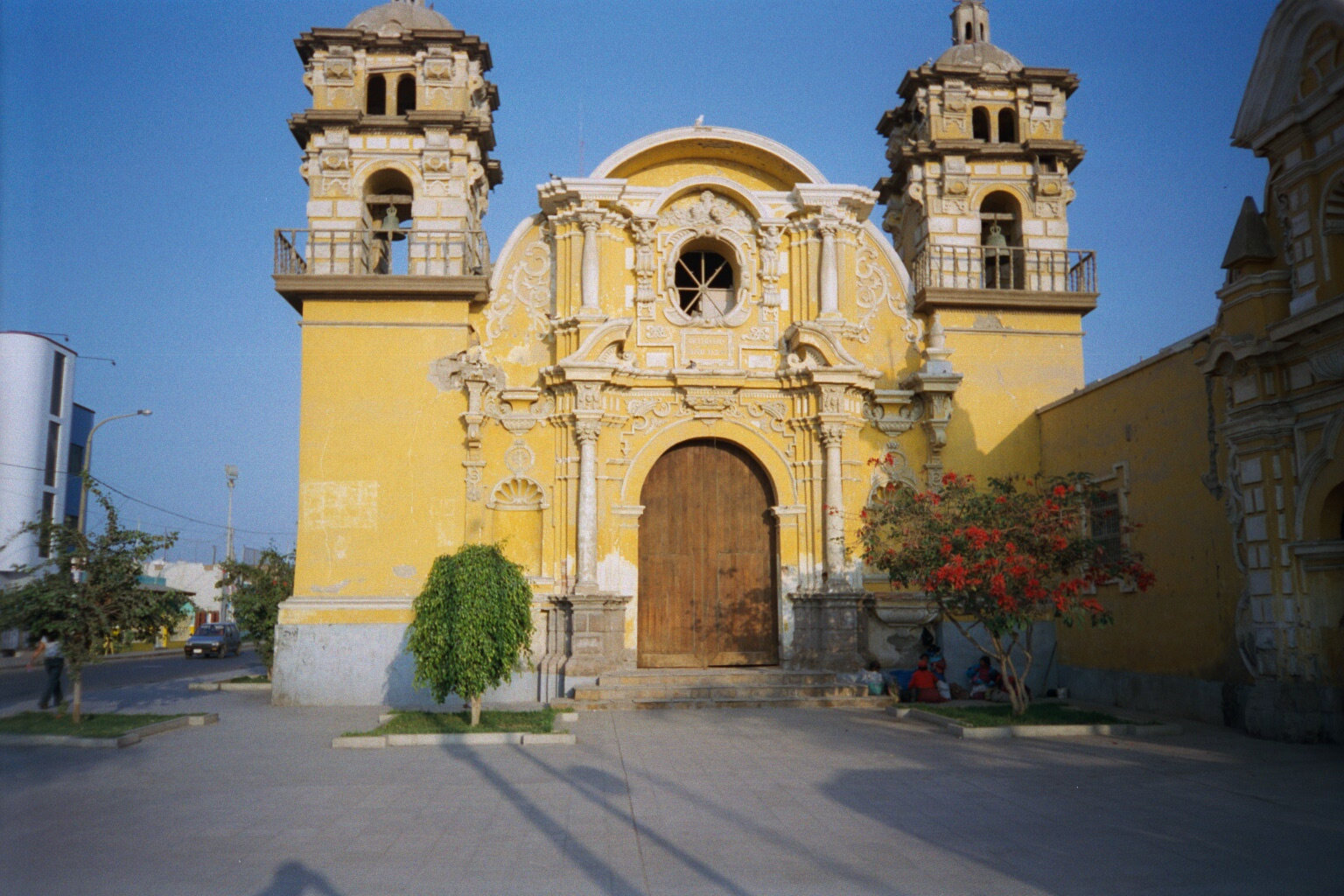
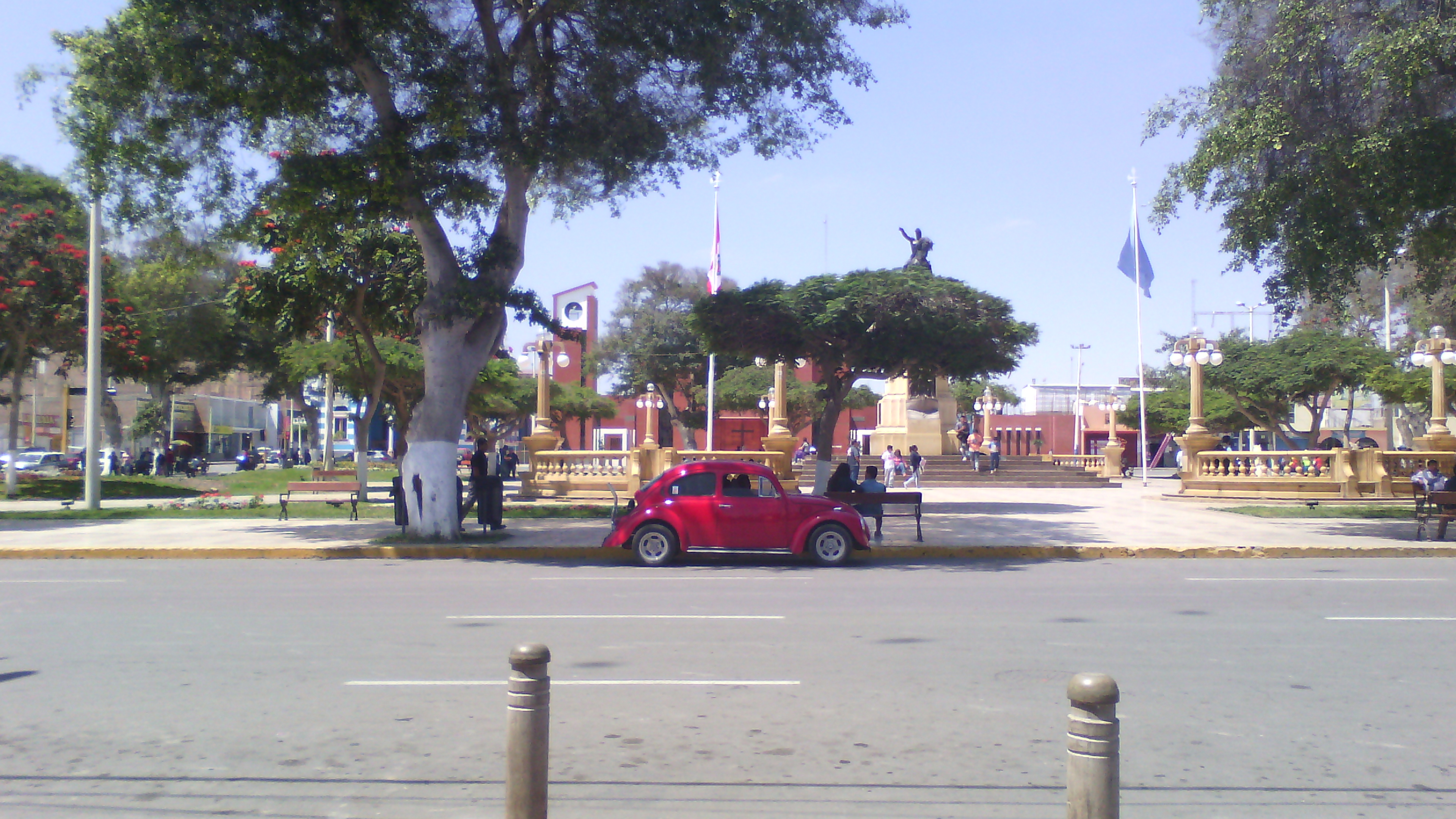

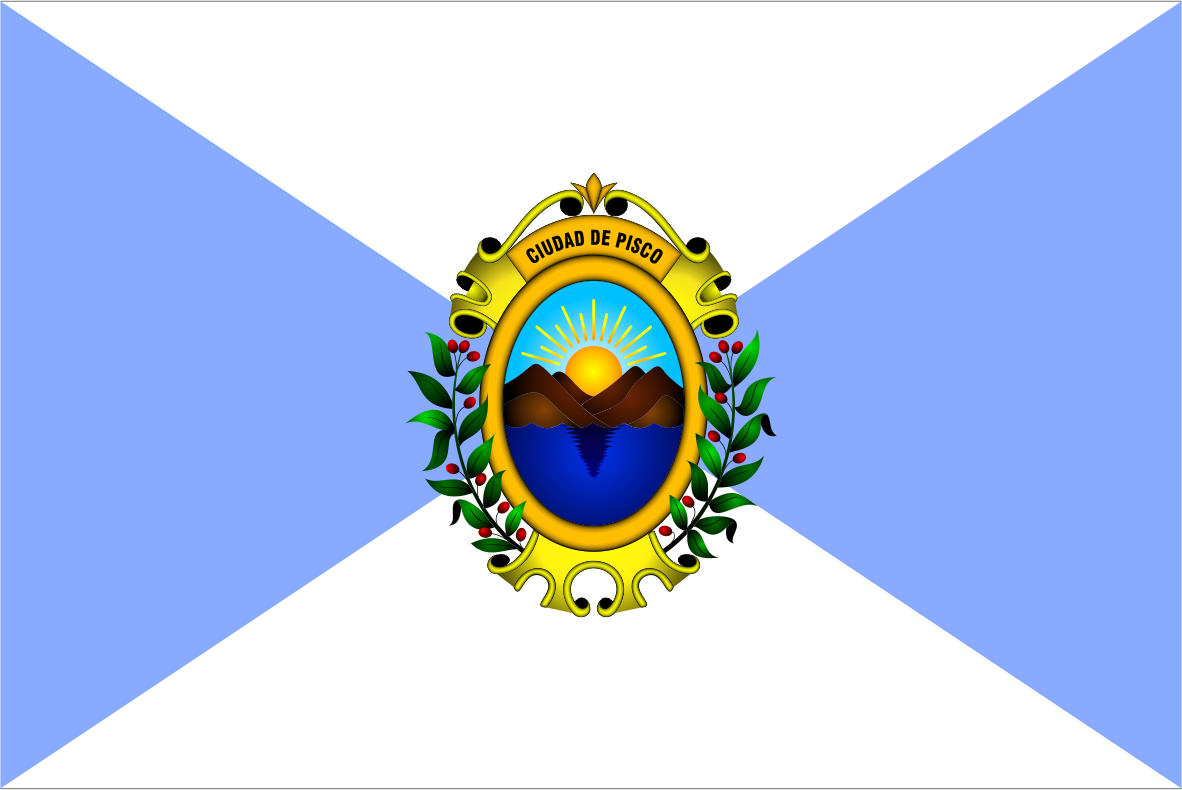
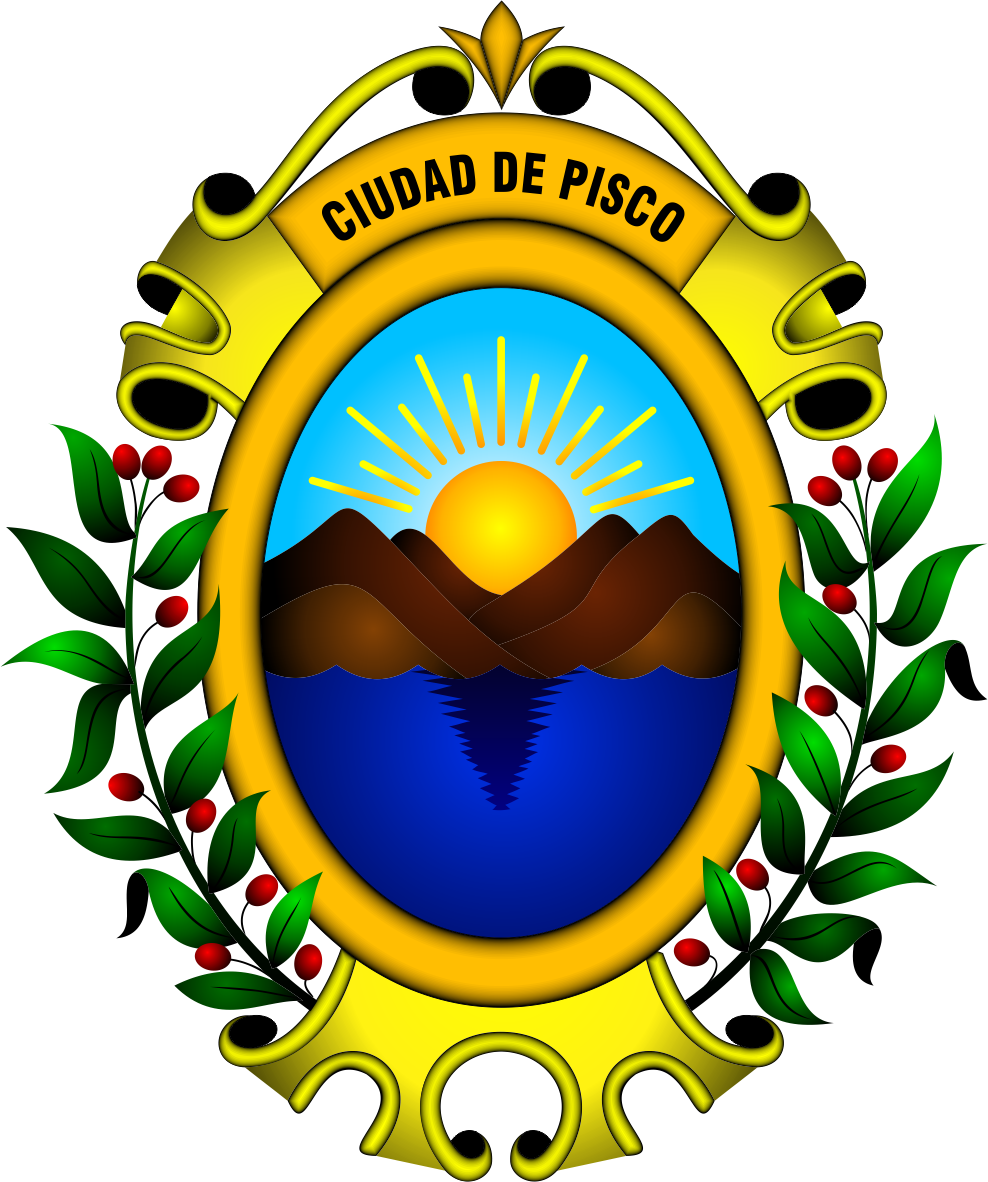
- Flag Coat of arms

- Location within Peru
- Coordinates: 13°43′S 76°12′W
- Country: Peru
- Region: Ica
- Province: Pisco
- District: Pisco

Government
  - Mayor: Juan Mendoza Uribe (2019-2022)

Area
  - Total: 3,978.19 km^{2} (1,535.99 sq mi)
- Elevation: 9 m (30 ft)

Population
  - Estimate (2015): 104,656
- Demonym: Pisquena(o)
- Time zone: UTC-5 (PET)
- Website: Official Website

Pisco (Quechua: Pisqu) is a city located in the Department of Ica of Peru, the capital of the Pisco Province. The city is around 9 metres (28 feet) above sea level. Pisco was founded in 1640, close to the indigenous emplacement of the same name. Pisco originally prospered because of its nearby vineyards and became noted for its grape brandy or pisco which was exported from its port. Pisco has an estimated population of 104,656 (est. 2015).

== History ==
=== Mid 16th Century: Pisco is Born ===
The town of Santa Maria Magdalena, which was founded in 1572, had a port named Pisco, after the name of the valley in which it was located. This port became an important route for distribution of the liqueur throughout Peru. Demand for the product grew as sailors from around the world who called into the Port of Pisco created an important international trade link and further demand for the product. Over time, the town of Santa Maria Magdalena became simply known as 'Pisco' with the same name adopted for the grape liqueur produced from the area. In a few decades, Pisco was distributed along the entire coast of Peru and Chile, as well as being exported through ports in the Pacific and Europe.

=== 17th century ===
The city was highly populated until 1685, when it was pillaged by English pirates. The city suffered again in 1687 because of an earthquake. Vines are abundant, despite the sandy and infertile terrain; they grow in many places because of the moisture from inside the earth and provide Lima with its wines and grape concentrates that run along the various mountain provinces extending to Panama and Guayaquil.

Pisco was attacked by the pirates Clerck and David; in addition, in 1687 it was destroyed by an earthquake, which caused a tsunami to follow, destroying the city further. Viceroy Melchor Antonio Portocarrero Lazo de la Vega then moved it to its current location, reestablishing it in 1689 as "Villa de Nuestra Señora de la Concordia de Pisco".

=== Independence of Peru ===
In 1820, the Liberating Expedition arrived in Pisco under the command of José de San Martín and Bernardo O'Higgins Riquelme, disembarking in the Bay of Paracas, where the first flag and the first national emblem of Peru were created. In 1832, the Peruvian Congress ordered by law that the city of Lima would receive the title of "Villa y Puerto de la Independencia", extending this qualification to both the town and the riverbank population. In 1868, the "town of Pisco" was designated capital of the new province of Chincha, and in 1898 it was elevated to the rank of "city". In 1947, the historian pisqueño Mamerto Castillo Negrón said that Pisco had received two additions in its history that granted it honors worthy of merit, the first being "Villa and Puerto de la Independencia" and the second, its recognition as a provincial capital.

=== 2007 earthquake ===
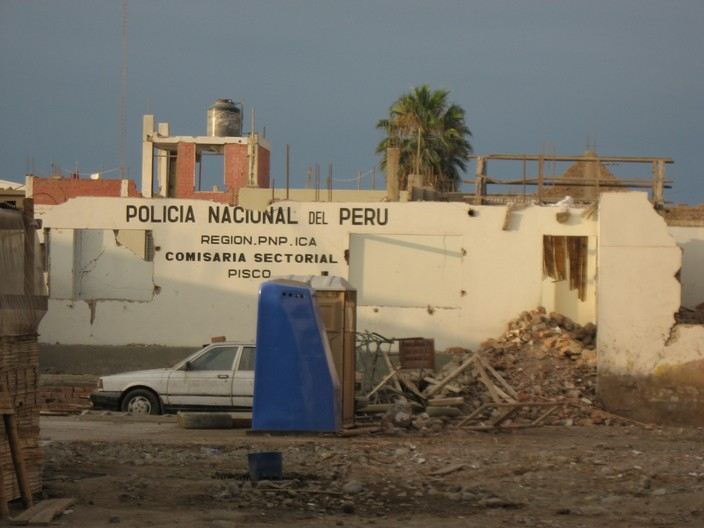
Pisco after the earthquake

The city was very near the center of the devastating 8.0-magnitude earthquake that struck southern Peru on Wednesday, 15 August 2007. Media officials reported that 80% of the city was destroyed, including the central San Clemente Cathedral of Pisco, located in Plaza de Armas, in which mass was taking place at the time of the earthquake. The resulting dead account for a reported 30 percent of the total fatalities caused by the earthquake. Several hundred more were killed throughout the city. Several years on, the city is still recovering from the damage done during the earthquake.

== Geography ==
=== Climate ===
The city of Pisco experiences hot arid climate, with warm temperatures and extremely low rainfall prevailing all year-round. According to the Köppen Climate Classification system, Pisco has a desert climate, abbreviated BWh on climate maps. The average maximum temperature in the city is 23.7 °C (74.7 °F), ranging from a February peak of 27.7 °C (81.9 °F) to a July low of 20.2 °C (68.4 °F). The average minimum temperature in the city is 15.8 °C (60.4 °F), fluctuating from 19.5 °C (67.1 °F) to 12.9 °C (55.2 °F) in the months of February and August respectively. Rainfall is extremely low; the average annual rainfall total amounts to a mere 1.5 mm (0.1 in).

Climate data for Pisco (1991–2020, extremes 1942–present)
Month	Jan	Feb	Mar	Apr	May	Jun	Jul	Aug	Sep	Oct	Nov	Dec	Year
Record high °C (°F)	33.9 (93.0)	33.2 (91.8)	33.5 (92.3)	32.0 (89.6)	30.2 (86.4)	31.0 (87.8)	28.0 (82.4)	28.4 (83.1)	29.2 (84.6)	27.0 (80.6)	28.3 (82.9)	31.2 (88.2)	33.9 (93.0)
Mean daily maximum °C (°F)	28.0 (82.4)	29.3 (84.7)	28.8 (83.8)	26.8 (80.2)	24.0 (75.2)	22.1 (71.8)	21.2 (70.2)	21.1 (70.0)	21.7 (71.1)	22.6 (72.7)	23.9 (75.0)	25.9 (78.6)	24.6 (76.3)
Daily mean °C (°F)	23.6 (74.5)	24.6 (76.3)	24.2 (75.6)	22.2 (72.0)	19.7 (67.5)	18.1 (64.6)	17.4 (63.3)	17.1 (62.8)	17.6 (63.7)	18.4 (65.1)	19.5 (67.1)	21.6 (70.9)	20.3 (68.5)
Mean daily minimum °C (°F)	19.3 (66.7)	20.0 (68.0)	19.6 (67.3)	17.6 (63.7)	15.4 (59.7)	14.3 (57.7)	13.7 (56.7)	13.3 (55.9)	13.7 (56.7)	14.4 (57.9)	15.2 (59.4)	17.4 (63.3)	16.1 (61.0)
Record low °C (°F)	10.5 (50.9)	14.3 (57.7)	12.0 (53.6)	10.0 (50.0)	7.0 (44.6)	7.8 (46.0)	7.0 (44.6)	7.2 (45.0)	8.0 (46.4)	7.0 (44.6)	9.5 (49.1)	9.2 (48.6)	7.0 (44.6)
Average rainfall mm (inches)	0.2 (0.01)	0.1 (0.00)	0.2 (0.01)	0.0 (0.0)	0.0 (0.0)	0.1 (0.00)	0.1 (0.00)	0.3 (0.01)	0.2 (0.01)	0.2 (0.01)	0.1 (0.00)	0.0 (0.0)	1.5 (0.06)
Average rainy days (≥ 1.0 mm)	0.1	0.1	0.0	0.0	0.0	0.0	0.1	0.0	0.1	0.2	0.0	0.0	0.5
Average relative humidity (%)	83	81	81	82	83	82	81	83	84	83	82	82	82
Source 1: Meteo Climat
Source 2: NOAA (rainfall 1961-1990), Deutscher Wetterdienst (precipitation days 1970–1990 and humidity 1954–1969)

== Transport ==
Pisco is served by the Capitán FAP Renán Elías Olivera Airport (IATA: PIO, ICAO: SPSO), located in Pisco (PIO). This international airport shares facilities with the Peruvian Air Force and is also designated as a backup airport to the Jorge Chávez International Airport (IATA: LIM, ICAO: SPIM) in Lima.

On September 4, 2012, President Ollanta Humala was present for the beginning of renovations to the airport, which were expected to be operational by 2015 with the ability to receive an anticipated 400,000 passengers a year in 2017.

== Tourist attractions ==
Pisco is a Quechua word meaning "bird". The area is often visited because of the concentration of marine animals and birds at the Paracas National Reserve, or the Peruvian Galápagos. At the reserve, there are the Islas Ballestas, a collection of islands that are off limits to people, but boat tours can get close to. The Chincha Islands are also near the coast. Many bird species can be seen in the islands, including pelicans, penguins, cormorants, Peruvian boobies, and Inca terns, as well as sea lions, turtles, dolphins, and whales.

Another attraction in the area is El Candelabro, a giant lamp dug in the rough sand in the same method used by the creators of the Nazca Lines.

One of the major ancient civilizations in Peru, the Paracas culture, flourished in the area where Pisco sits. Due to its ease of access and its crossroads to the Andes, the Spaniards may have considered making Pisco the capital, before they decided on Lima.

In the city is the Plaza de Armas, where people buy tejas, small sweets made from pecans and assorted dried fruits. Many different buildings that surround the Plaza are the statue of José de San Martín, the mansion he lived in, and the Municipal Palace. Another building in the city is the heavily baroque Iglesia de la Compañía, begun in 1689, which features a superb carved pulpit and gold-leaf altarpiece.

Near the town, just off the road to Ayacucho, lies the large, well-preserved Inca site of Tambo Colorado.

== Gallery ==
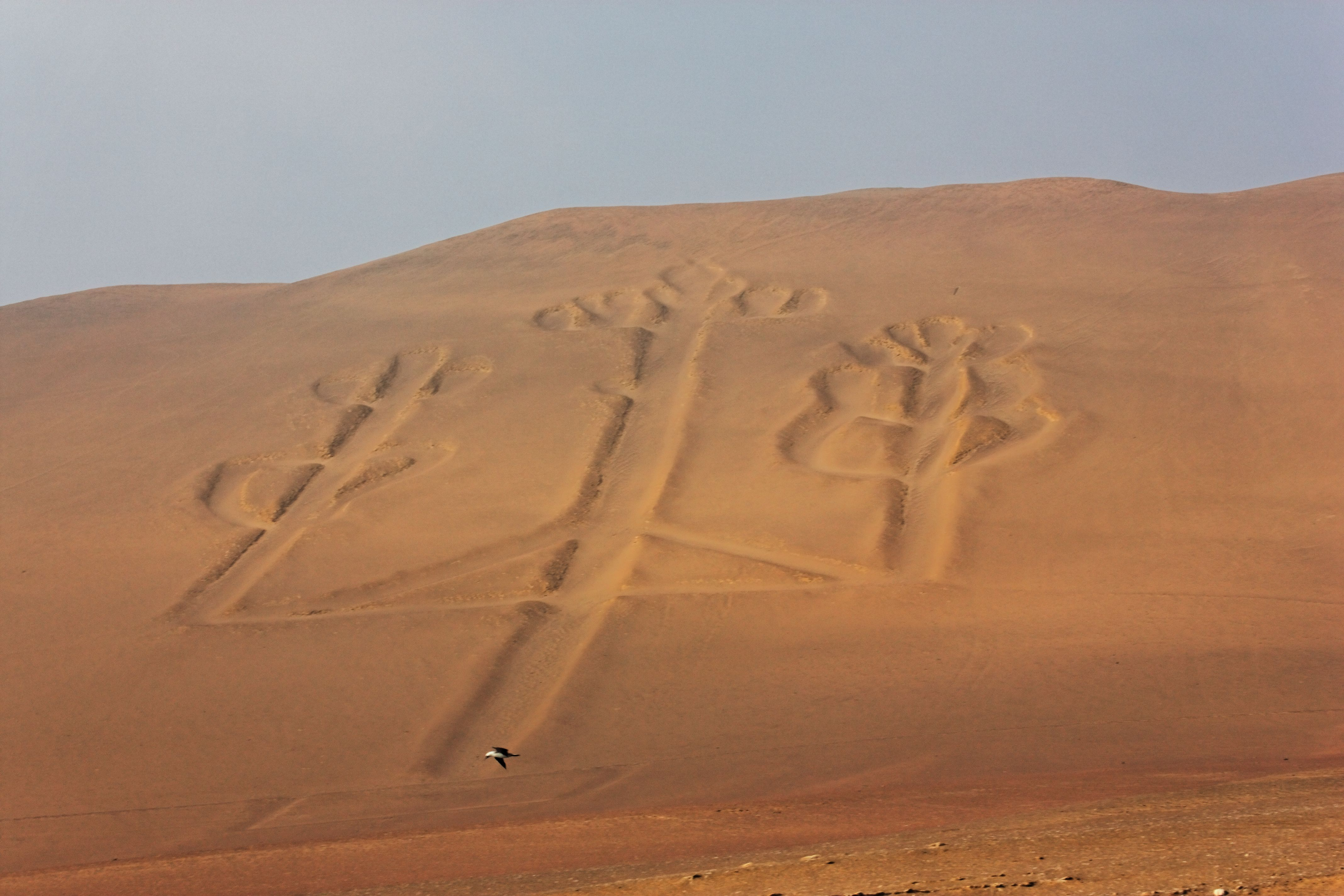
El Candelabro, the north part of the Paracas peninsula usually seen on tours going to the Ballestas Islands

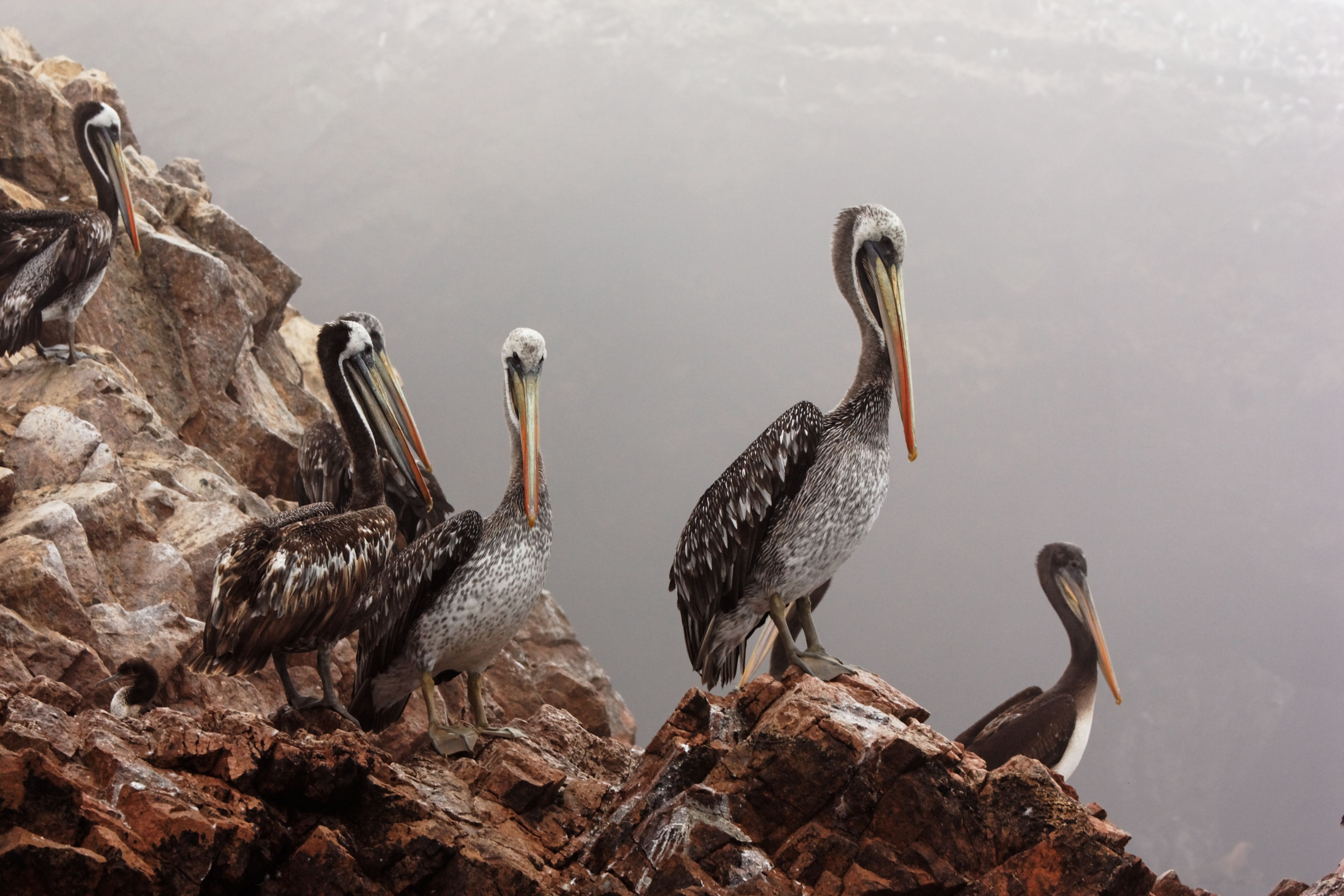
Pelicans, Ballestas Islands

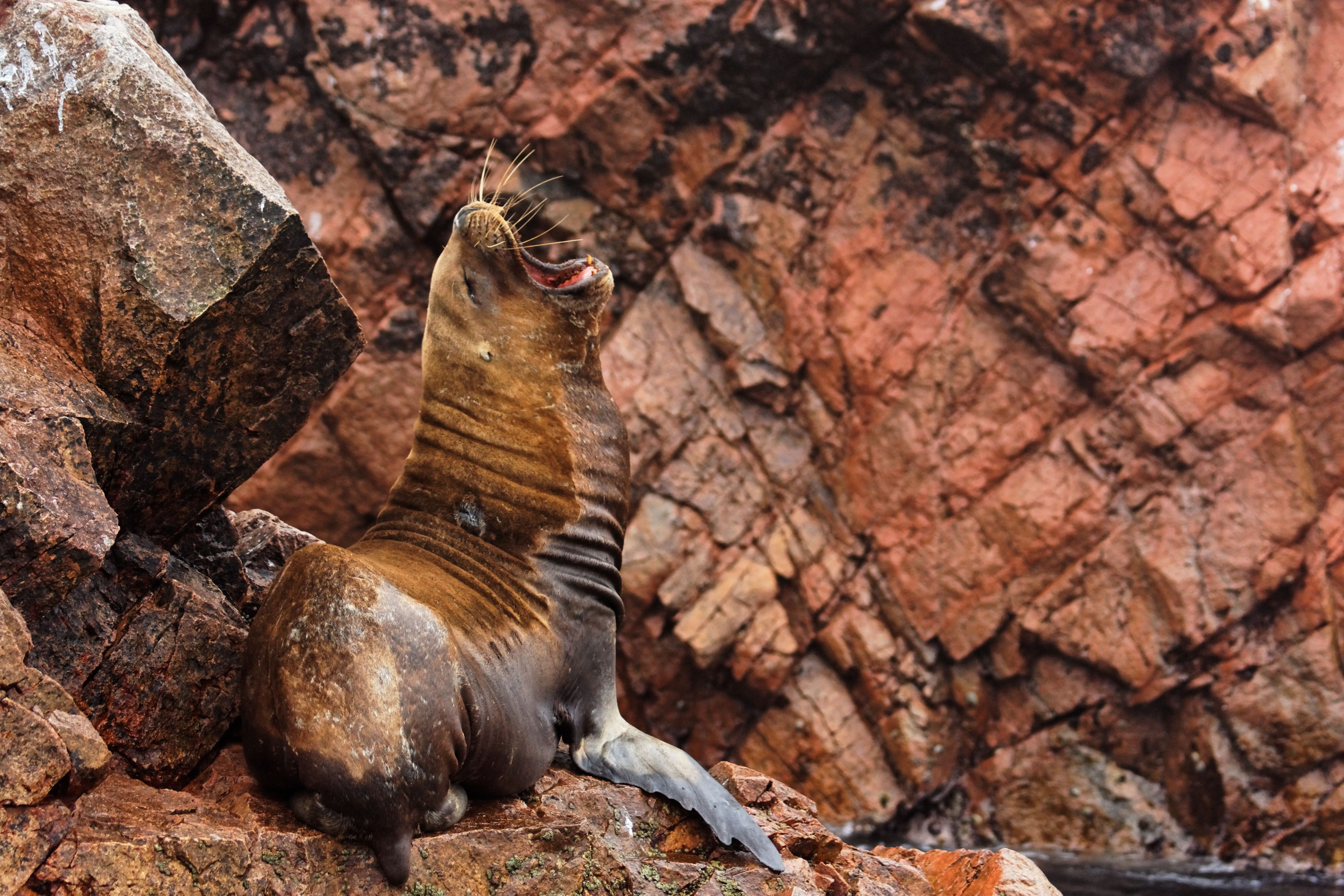
Sea Lion, Ballestas Islands

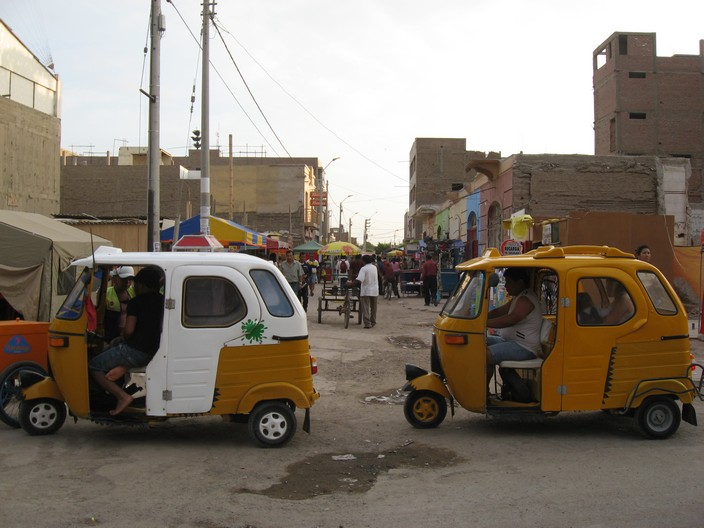
Local taxi station

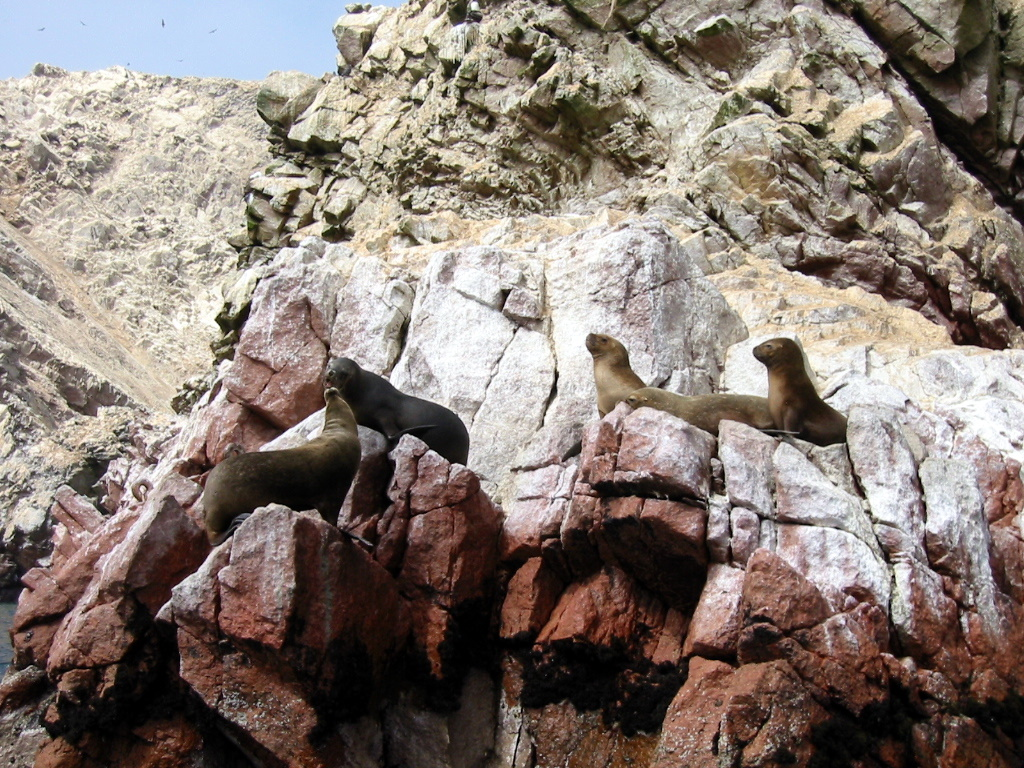
Seals on the Ballestas Islands

== Notable people ==
- Raúl Porras Barrenechea, historian, diplomat
- Juan de Dios Guevara, chemist
- Sarah Roberts (1872–1913), the subject of a vampire legend, died and is buried in Pisco
- Abraham Valdelomar, writer

== International relations ==
=== Twin towns – Sister cities ===
Pisco is twinned with:

- Rosario, Argentina
- Cognac, France
- Kobe, Japan
