= Jinshan Township =

Jinshan Township (traditional Chinese: 金山鄉; simplified Chinese: 金山乡) may refer to:

== Republic of China (Taiwan) ==
- Jinshan District, New Taipei, formerly Jinshan Township
- Jinfeng, Taitung, Taiwan, a township that was formerly named Jinshan
