= Guihua Subdistrict =

Subdistrict of Hetang District in Zhuzhou City, China

Coordinates: 27°52′2″N 113°10′28″E

Guihua Subdistrict (Chinese: 桂花街道; pinyin: Guìhuā Jiēdào) is a subdistrict and the seat of Hetang District in Zhuzhou, Hunan, China. It has an area of 10.8 km^{2} (4.2 sq mi) with a population of 38,414 (as of 2010). The subdistrict has 2 villages and 4 communities under its jurisdiction. Its seat is at East Xinhua Road (新华东路).

== History ==
The subdistrict of Guihua was formed in 2005. In the year of 2005, Hetangpu (Chinese: 荷塘铺乡) ceased to be a separate township, it was divided to the other township-level divisions. Three villages of Guihua, Xintangpo and Daijialing from the township of Hetangpu, four communities of Guihua, Xinhe, Zhaojiachong and Xingyang from the subdistrict of Songjiaqiao were transferred to the newly formed subdistrict of Guihua.

== Subdivisions ==
Guihua Subdistrict has 4 communities and 2 villages under its jurisdiction.

4 communities

- Xiangyang Community (Chinese: 向阳社区)
- Xinhe Community (Chinese: 新荷社区)
- Xizi Community (Chinese: 西子社区)
- Zhaojiachong Community (Chinese: 赵家冲社区)

2 villages

- Daijialing Village (Chinese: 戴家岭村)
- Xingui Village (Chinese: 新桂村; merging the former two villages of Guihua and Xintangpo in 2016, 2016年原桂花、新塘坡二村合并)
