= Xianyu, Zhuzhou =

Town in Hetang District, Zhuzhou, Hunan, China

Coordinates: 27.94464°N 113.22832°E

Xianyu (Chinese: 仙庾镇; pinyin: Xiānyǔ Zhèn) is a town of Hetang District in Zhuzhou, Hunan, China. It has an area of 73.58 km^{2} (28.41 sq mi) with a population of 29,400 (as of 2017). The town has 10 villages and a community under its jurisdiction, its seat is Xiajiaduan (Chinese: 夏家塅).

== History ==
The town of Xianyu is originally Dieping Township (Chinese: 蝶屏乡). It ceased to be a township and was reformed as the town of Xianyu on December 18, 2001, it took its name after Xianyu Mountain (Chinese: 仙庾岭).

The two villages of Shuaijiaduan (Chinese: 帅家塅村) and Dongyuanchong (Chinese: 东元冲村) of Mingzhao Township (Chinese: 明照乡) were transferred to the town in 2005. It had an area of 59.5 km^{2} (23.0 sq mi) with a population of 19,300 (as of 2005), the town was divided into 17 villages and a community in 2005. Mingzhao Township was merged to the town in 2015. It covered an area of 105.88 km^{2} (40.88 sq mi) with a population of 41,300 (as of 2015), the town had 30 villages and a community under its jurisdiction in 2015. 2 villages of Xianyu were transferred to Jinshan Subdistrict and 5 villages to Songjiaqiao Subdistrict in 2017, the town has an area of 73.58 km^{2} (28.41 sq mi) with a population of 29,400 (as of 2017), it has 10 villages and a community under its jurisdiction.

== Subdivisions ==
10 villages

- Dieping Village (Chinese: 蝶屏村)
- Dongshan Village (Chinese: 东山村)
- Huangpotian Village (Chinese: 黄陂田村)
- Huangtang Village (Chinese: 黄塘村)
- Lianxing Village (Chinese: 联星村)
- Tingziqiang Village (Chinese: 亭子前村)
- Xianyuling Village (Chinese: 仙庾岭村)
- Xingtang Village (Chinese: 兴塘村)
- Xujiatang Village (Chinese: 徐家塘村)
- Zhangxia Village (Chinese: 樟霞村)

1 community

- Yongfu Community (Chinese: 永福社区)
