= Capitán FAP Renán Elías Olivera Airport =

Airport in Peru

Capitán FAP Renán Elías Olivera International Airport
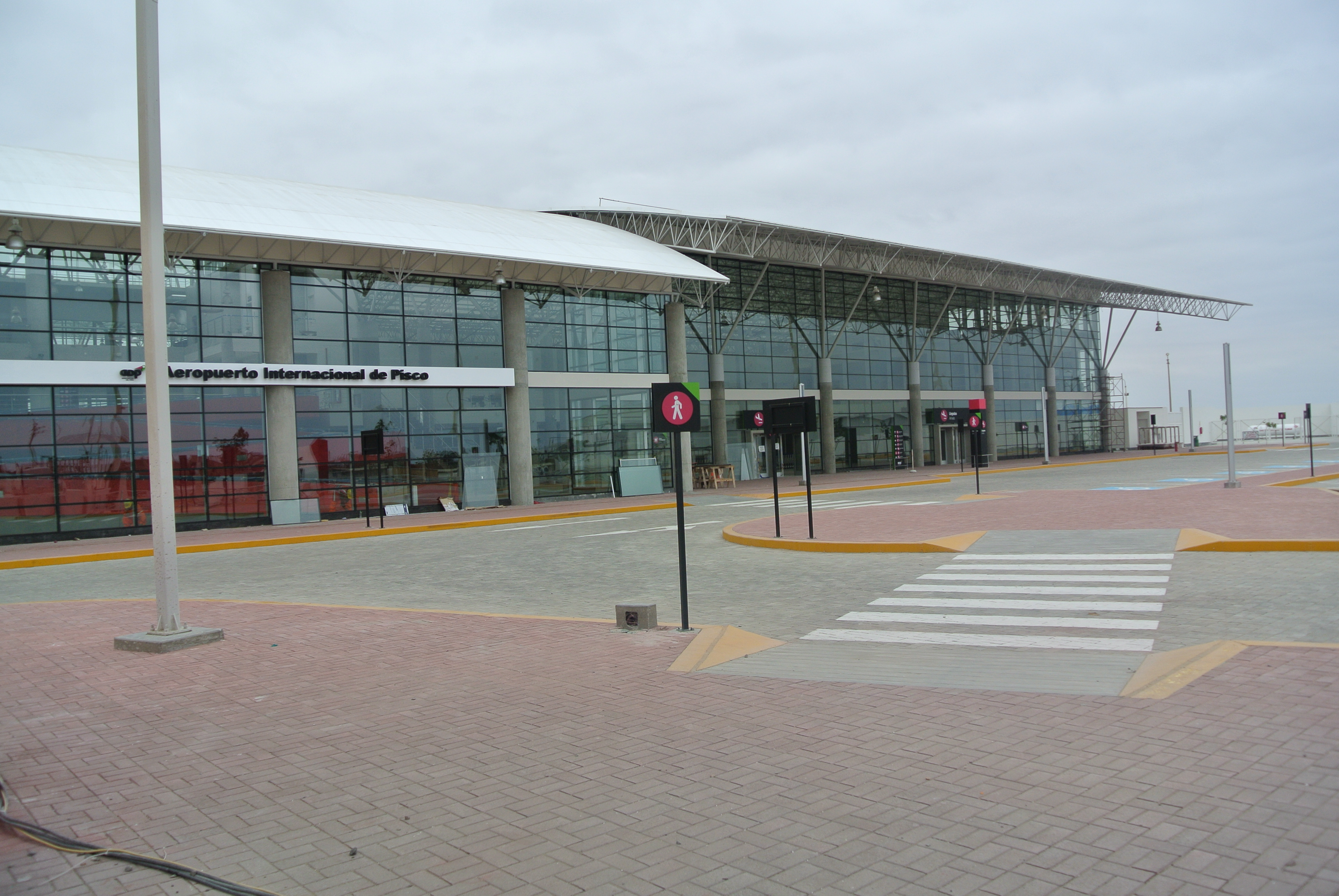
- IATA: PIO; ICAO: SPSO

Summary
- Airport type: Military/Public
- Operator: ADP
- Location: Pisco, Peru
- Elevation AMSL: 39 ft / 12 m
- Coordinates: 13°44′42″S 76°13′15″W

Map
- Location of the airport in Peru

Runways
Direction	Length		Surface
Direction	m	ft	Surface
04/22	3,020	9,908	Asphalt, concrete
- Sources: GCM

The Capitán FAP Renán Elías Olivera Airport (IATA: PIO, ICAO: SPSO) is an airport serving Pisco, an oceanside city in the Ica Region of Peru. It is used by the Peruvian Army, but it can be also used by civil aircraft.

A new terminal building became operational in 2015. The new terminal is expected to help bring new airlines and destinations for the city, and make it a gateway for international passengers.

== Airlines and destinations ==
There are currently no scheduled flights. However, Aerodiana operates chartered flights over the Nazca Lines.

== See also ==
- Transport in Peru
- List of airports in Peru
