= Adam Gee =

Adam Gee may refer to:

- Adam Gee (producer) (born 1963), English interactive media and TV producer
- Adam Gee (golfer) (born 1980), English golfer
- Adam Gee (referee) (born 1985), Australian rugby league referee
