= Readymix logo geoglyph =

- Year: 1965
- Type: Geoglyph
- Dimensions: 3.2 km × 1.6 km (2.0 miles × 0.99 miles)
- Location: Caiguna, Western Australia; 32°13′01.0″S 125°21′33.9″E

The Readymix logo geoglyph is a large geoglyph of the Readymix logo carved into the ground of the Nullarbor Plain about 13 kilometres (8.1 miles) north west of Caiguna, Western Australia. At the time of its creation the Readymix logo geoglyph was the largest such signage of its kind, and appeared in the Guinness Book of Records between 1972 and 1991, first as the world's largest advertising sign and, later, as the world's largest letters. The 3.2 kilometres (2.0 miles) wide, 1.6 kilometres (0.99 miles) tall logo consists of the words "READYMIX" surrounded by a diamond. Each letter is 240 metres (790 ft) high by 180 metres (590 ft) wide, with a line thickness of 12 metres (39 ft).

== History ==
Prior to the 1960s, the Eyre Highway was largely a dirt track, with only small sections of lightly graveled or bitumen roads across the 1,664 km length. Work to seal the Eyre Highway was undertaken in the 1960s and 1970s by the state governments of South Australia and Western Australia. In mid-1964, the Readymix Group received a tender to undertake quarrying operations along the Eyre Highway during its construction, beginning in July 1964 at Balladonia, Western Australia. In 1965, the Readymix logo was carved into the ground by a grader driver, exposing the white limestone bedrock of the Nullarbor Plain. The logo was allegedly constructed without approval of the state government or the landholder, although informal permission may have been granted by the station manager at the time.

The reason for the initial construction of the logo is contested. Readymix staff have asserted that the logo was initially conceived as distinctively shaped and thus easily identifiable emergency landing strip for aircraft owned and operated by Readymix. On the other hand, some suggestion has been made that the logo was simply constructed by bored surveyors during a delay in work on the Eyre Highway as a unique advertisement. Regardless of the reason for its initial construction, it is regarded as unlikely that the diamond was ever actually used as a landing strip, and that subsequent regrading served only to maintain the logo as an advertisement and landmark.

During the 1960s and 1970s, Ansett and Trans Australia Airlines domestic flights used a VOR station at Caiguna as a waypoint on routes between Perth and eastern Australian capitals such as Adelaide, Melbourne, and Sydney. The close proximity of the Readymix logo to this navigational waypoint resulted in the logo being visible to the 400 or so passengers who flew across Australia daily.

Due to increases in aircraft size and the advent of modern navigational technology, by the 1980s domestic flights to and from Perth no longer passed over the logo, instead flying more directly by passing over the Great Australian Bight.

Permission to maintain the logo was eventually withdrawn, and by 1998 the diamond and letters were more or less overgrown and barely visible. Only with the advent of satellite mapping programs has interest in the Readymix Logo renewed.

== Legacy ==
The Readymix logo geoglyph predates the creation of other modern Australian geoglyphs.

- The Marree Man, a 4 kilometres (2.5 miles) tall aboriginal figure anonymously created on a plateau 60 kilometres (37 miles) west of the township of Marree, South Australia in 1998.
- In 2001 the Mundi Man or Eldee man, a 2 by 2 kilometres (1.2 by 1.2 miles) portrait of a smiling stockman was created by artist Peter "Ando" Anderson on the Mundi Mundi Plains north of Silverton, New South Wales, to celebrate the Year of the Outback.
- The Bunjil Geoglyph, a 100 metres (330 ft) wide stone sculpture in the shape of a wedged-tail eagle, created in 2006 by sculptor Andrew Rogers to commemorate the indigenous Creator Spirit Bunjil and the Wathaurong Aboriginal people.

The Readymix logo geoglyph is purported to be the first advertisement visible from space. Several other oversized corporate logos and advertisements have been produced since the creation of the Readymix logo geoglyph in 1965, although it is unlikely the Readymix logo geoglyph served as a direct inspiration.

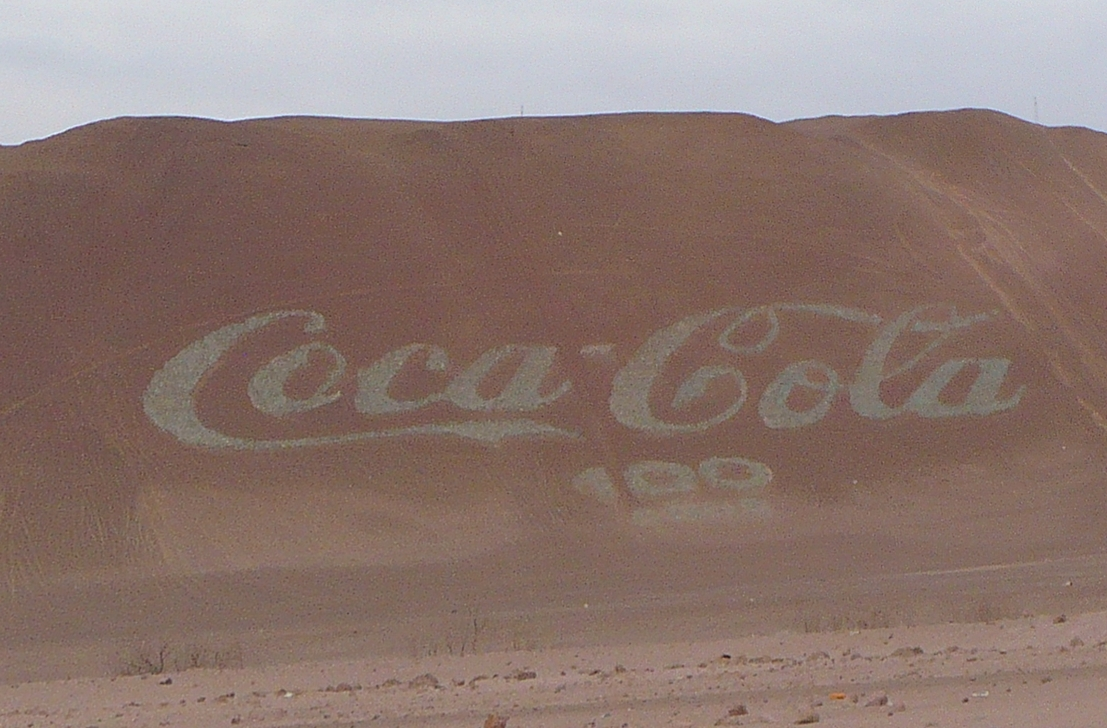
The Coca-Cola logo in Chile.

- In 1986, 70,000 empty bottles of Coca-Cola were used to construct a 142 metres (466 ft) rendition of the Coca-Cola logo in the Chilean desert of Arica to celebrate Coca-Cola's 100th anniversary.
- In 2006, Kentucky Fried Chicken placed a 8,129 square metres (87,500 ft^{2}) image of Colonel Sanders in the Nevada desert, incorrectly claiming that their "astrovertisement" was the first brand that could be seen from space.
- In 2006, Maxim created a 33 by 23 metres (108 ft × 75 ft) version of an old cover image featuring actress Eva Longoria to celebrate its 100th issue.
