= MindGym =

1996 video game

- Release: 1996

MindGym is a surreal game about creative thinking. It was produced as a CD-ROM in 1996 by London-based Melrose Film Productions and NoHo Digital and published by Macmillan (UK), Simon & Schuster (US) and Ravensburger (Germany).

== Development ==
Screen from German version

A client-driven project, Mindgym was conceived and produced by Adam Gee, while working at video training company Melrose to create an "interactive training product that would teach corporate middle-management about the value of 'creative thinking'". He approached NoHo with the idea as the company had the capacity to make games Tim Wright of NoHo designed the project with a specific vision to utilise the talents of Rob Bevan as art director, Adam Gee as producer and script editor, Jason Loader as 3d animator and comedian, and Nigel Harris as sound designer. After a script and demo were created, NoHo teamed up with Macmillan, having proven that the concept could be funnier, bigger, and have a broader appeal.

== Reception ==
=== Critical reception ===
The project has been categorised as "a personality test", "an interactive experience", "comedy self help disk", and "a game". It has been likened to comedic surreal video games such as You Don't Know Jack and Starship Titanic.

Sacha Cohen of The Washington Post compared the surreal and silly game to the work of Salvador Dalí and Dadaism, while describing the personal trainer as a cross between the Three Stooges and Richard Simmons, ultimately questioning what the makers of the program were thinking when they designed it.

=== Awards and nominations ===
MindGym won the very first BAFTA Interactive Entertainment Award in the Comedy category. The award was presented in February 1998 by Stephen Fry. The other nominations were Douglas Adams' Starship Titanic and You Don't Know Jack.

MindGym was awarded Millennium Product status by the UK's Design Council.

MindGym was a runner-up for Computer Gaming World's 1999 "Puzzle/Classics Game of the Year" award, which ultimately went to Pro Pinball: Fantastic Journey.
