= Britglyph =

Britglyph was a collaborative locative art and geoglyph project created by Alfie Dennen for ShoZu which took place in the United Kingdom between December 2008 and March 2009. Participants were instructed to travel to specific locations across the country with a rock or stone taken from near where they live. Once at the designated spot, the participants would capture a photograph or video of themselves and the rock and upload that to the main website, leaving the rock at the new location. As these media were added to the main site, the image of a watch and chain inspired by John Harrison's marine chronometer H5 was drawn on the main project website, with the rocks creating a geoglyph on the Earth's surface.

== See also ==
- Locative art
- Mobile media
- Locative media

== Awards ==
Britglyph won the Experimental and Innovation Award at the Webbys 2009.
