= Big Art Mob =

- Founded: 2006
- Current status: Offline

The Big Art Mob was a website founded in 2006 and re-launched in 2012, that provides a platform and toolset for documenting and mapping art visible in public, and was dedicated to showcasing and celebrating public art and ephemeral works such as street art, performance art and graffiti. The site was conceived and created by Adam Gee and Alfie Dennen.

== Mission ==
The crucial aim of the site was to create the first canonical record of all the public art in the world. The site also offered its own working definition of public art. Initially created to support the Channel 4 documentary series The Big Art Project, the site was spun off as a standalone site owned and administered by Art Public. This online documentation appears to no longer be active. This website appears to no longer exists.

At the homepage of the Big Art Mob website were images, videos, and descriptive comments documenting public art in all its forms, and other news, as well as navigational tools for searching the site's voluminous archive (approximately 13,000 artworks mapped as of 04 09 2012).

The website's archive spanned back to June 2006. The archive could be searched by keyword, tag, artist name and location. The website had a twinned approach to achieving its aims: partnerships/relationships with institutions and a crowdsourcing approach.
