= Acre geoglyphs =

Geoglyphs in Acre, Brazil

Acre Geoglyphs
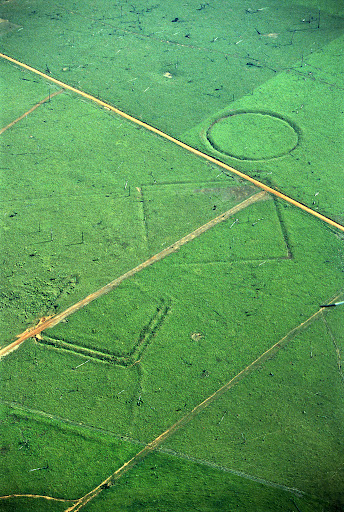
- Acre Geoglyph in Fazenda Colorada

- Location within Brazil
- 10°36′07.3″S 67°55′03.8″W
- Type: Geoglyph
- Cultures: Pre-colonial Amazonian societies
- Location: Acre, Brazil
- Region: Western Amazon

Site notes
- Archaeologists: Ondemar Dias
- Discovered: 1977

The Acre geoglyphs are a group of ancient geoglyphs located in the Brazilian state of Acre. Called "earth tattoos" by some Indigenous groups in the region, these excavated earth structures were documented in the 1970s, more precisely 1977, when researcher Ondemar Dias noted eight of them in the land of Acre while carrying out his activities for the National Program for Archaeological Research in the Amazon Basin (Pronapaba). In 2018, one of these geoglyphs in Acre, which is approximately 2,500 years old, was listed by the National Institute of Historic and Artistic Heritage (IPHAN). The set of geoglyphs in Acre is currently on the World Heritage Tentative List as a candidate for Brazil.

== Localization ==
Geoglyphs have been found in the southwestern region of Western Amazon, majorly in the state of Acre, in areas of interfluves, igarapés springs, and floodplains, mainly between the Acre and Iquiri rivers. There are estimated more than 410 geoglyphs in the state spread over around 300 archaeological sites.

These geoglyphs form different geometric patterns and appear in several shapes, and are up to 13 ft (4m) deep. They are also believed to be created by the indigenous tribes as far as 1000BC.

== Function ==
According to IPHAN, there is no consensus among archaeologists and other researchers who study the function and use of these geoglyphs by pre-colonial Amazonian societies, but there is a convergence of conjectures to the idea that they were collective social spaces for ceremonial, symbolic, ritualistic or dwelling use.

== Dating ==
A coal sample (Hela-616) collected at the Fazenda Colorada site was analyzed with the radiocarbon dating method by the University of Helsinki, revealing an age of 750±35 BP (Before Present) or, in calibrated years, AD 1244-1378 (based on the 2 sigma confidence level - 95.4%), using 2003 as the base year. The 24-year reduction for Southern Hemisphere correction was considered. Studies conducted by Pärssinen et al. (2020) indicate that soil samples predating the geoglyph are approximately 7,000 years old (AD ±4980). Other samples and their respective datings suggest that the region of eastern Acre and northern Bolivia contains soil layers that evidence periodic, low-intensity burns, which created savannah-like openings in the rainforest during the Early and Middle Holocene (10,000–4,200 BP) and were likely used for human purposes.

== Listing ==
The Acre Geoglyphs are currently on Brazil's World Heritage Tentative List. This list gathers properties that may be able to receive the title of UNESCO World Heritage Site and may contribute to a better understanding of regional historical processes. The Acre Geoglyphs are described by IPHAN as relevant to the study of the occupation process and settlement patterns in the Amazon region.
