= We're Not Afraid =

Website about July 2005 London bombings

We're not Afraid! is a website which was created just hours after the 7 July 2005 London bombings as a place for Internet users from around the world to state that they were not being intimidated by the actions of the terrorists.

It grew rapidly and had over one thousand images as of August 2005, with more being added as they were emailed to the administrators. Alfie Dennen founded the site initially as a small photoblog and did not expect it to become so large. The site suffered problems due to over-use caused by media coverage in several British newspapers and on CNN.

A statement dated 19 July 2007 posted on the site states that although the URL remains valid "unfortunately we simply do not have anyone who has the time to keep everything running and dynamic. We are pleased however that the site will remain online as a permanent reminder of the terrorist attacks here in London in 2005."

At one point, there was a parody site, called We're shitting ourselves!, but it has since expired.
