= Adam Gee (producer) =

British media producer and commissioner

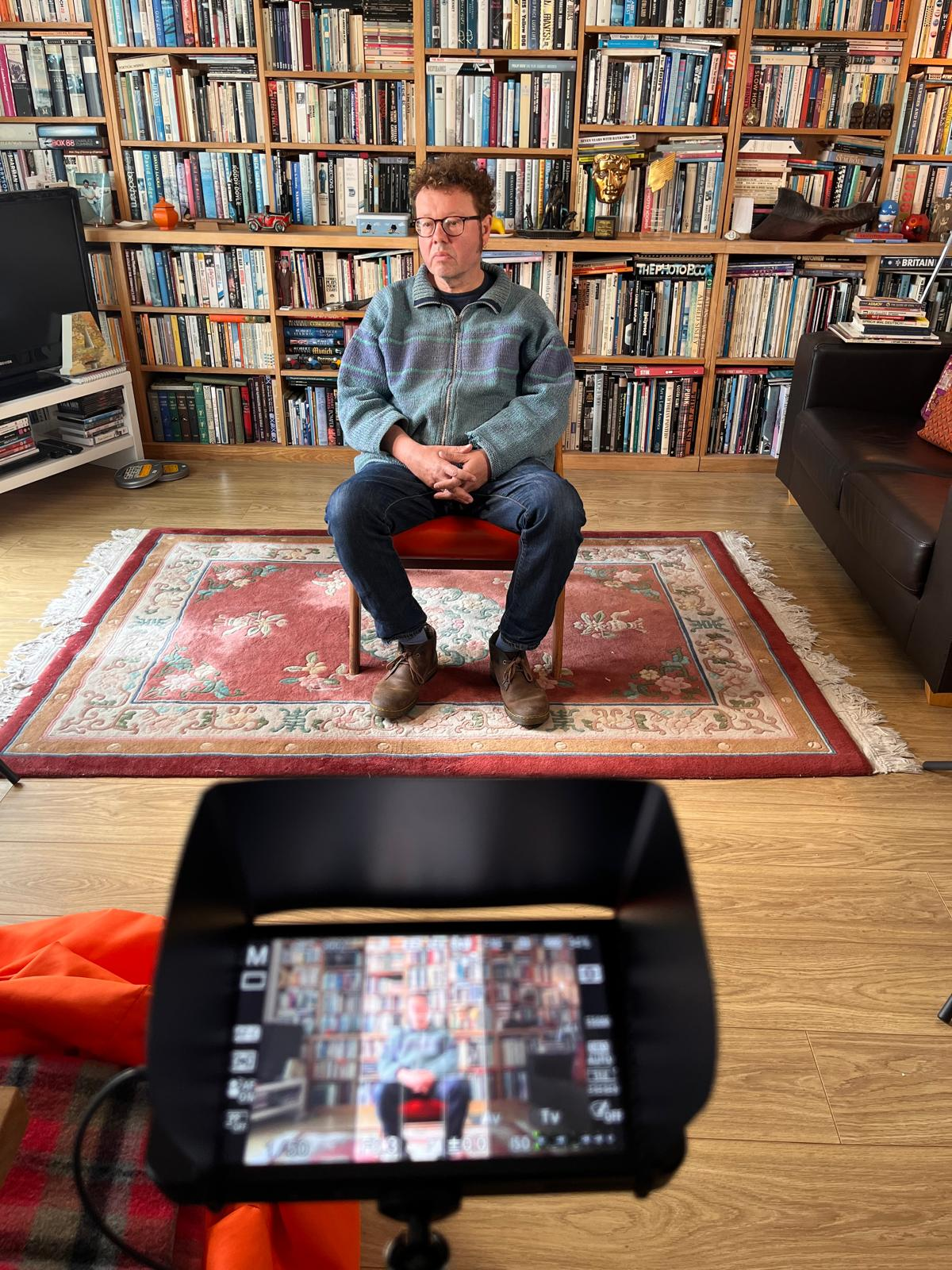
- Adam Gee, television, film and digital producer, 2026
- Born: 12 September 1963 (age 63); London, England
- Occupations: Film, TV, and digital producer; commissioner
- Known for: Multiplatform and interactive media innovation, documentary and short-form video commissioning
- Awards: 6 BAFTAs, 1 Emmy, Grand Award at New York Film & Television Awards

Adam Jonathan Gee (born 12 September 1963 in London, England) is a British film, TV and digital producer and commissioner. He has won over 90 international awards for his productions, including six BAFTAs and an Emmy. He is currently Head of Documentary Campus Masterschool in Berlin.

Prominent productions and commissions include The Pilgrimage of Gilbert and George, Embarrassing Bodies multiplatform, Missed Call, They Saw The Sun First, For people in trouble, MindGym, Big Art Mob, Hugh's Fish Fight, and Don't Stop the Music multiplatform.

== Early life and education ==
Gee was born in London and educated at the direct grant The Haberdashers' Aske's Boys' School in Elstree, Hertfordshire. He studied Modern Languages at Girton College, University of Cambridge and at the Université de Savoie, Chambéry, gaining an MA.

== Career ==
He began his career in 1983 at Solus Enterprises, a co-operative of cinematographers and film technicians including Roger Deakins ASC BSC, Jack Hazan, Dick Pope BSC, and David Mingay. Gee went on to become a producer/director/writer at Melrose Film Productions, London. He then set up, with three partners, a broadband production company, Redbus CPD, serving as Director of Production.

From 2003 to 2016, he was at Channel 4 Television, London, in the roles of Commercial/Creative Director: 4Learning and then Multiplatform and Online Video Commissioner (Factual).

Gee specialises in multiplatform projects around TV and digital-first content, commissioning and producing factual and documentary film, television and digital/interactive media, as well as short-form and online video. He was responsible for setting up Ideasfactory (renamed 4Talent), Channel 4's creative industries talent development initiative. In 2014, he helped establish original short form video on All 4, Channel 4's video on demand platform.

During his time at Channel 4, Gee commissioned socially impactful projects, including a study on the link between occupation, gender, and autistic traits conducted with Cambridge University and a multiplatform campaign that ended the discarding of fish in the North Sea.

In 2006, he co-created Big Art Mob, a crowdsourced platform documenting and mapping public art in the UK and beyond, cataloguing over 12,000 artworks and integrating Google Street View upon its 2012 relaunch.

In 2010, Gee commissioned and co-developed Quotables, a user-generated quotations platform co-funded by Channel 4 and Arts Council England. This inspired Channel 4's 2013 panel show Was It Something I Said?, hosted by David Mitchell with interactive Twitter-based participation.

Gee volunteered as a Games Maker during the London 2012 Olympic Games, working on digital content for LOCOG, as well as contributing to Channel 4's online Paralympics coverage.

He was the first commissioner of originals at Little Dot Studios, where he commissioned documentaries, including the BAFTA-winning short Missed Call. He went on to commission documentaries at Red Bull Media House, including the BAFTA-winning short They Saw The Sun First. Gee consulted for Ridley Scott Creative Group, before becoming a Commissioner of film, video and audio at CAA (Creative Artists Agency).

=== Recent Projects ===
In 2024, Gee commissioned The Pilgrimage of Gilbert & George, a feature documentary for Sky Arts exploring the iconic British artist duo, directed by Mike Christie and produced by Supercollider/Zinc TV.

In 2025, he conceived, developed, and produced Flying Through History, a digital-first series for Hearst Networks and Sky HISTORY that uses FPV drones to explore historic sites across the UK.

== Awards ==
Adam Gee has received numerous accolades for his innovative work in interactive media and television. In total, Gee has amassed over 90 international awards, including six BAFTAs, an International Emmy, and three Royal Television Society awards.

- 1997: Won the inaugural BAFTA Interactive Entertainment Award for Comedy for MindGym, a creative thinking CD-ROM game co-developed with Tim Wright and Rob Bevan, co-written with Ben Miller and Tim Wright.
- 2009: Awarded the BAFTA Television Award for Best Interactivity for Embarrassing Bodies Online, an extension of the hit Channel 4 series providing interactive health resources. More than 2.5 million videos were watched on the site, making it one of the most viewed areas on channel4.com.
- 2011: Hugh's Fish Fight, commissioned by Gee, won the BAFTA for Best Features, with the campaign amassing support from over 676,000 members of the public and influencing EU fisheries policy.
- 2012: Received the International Digital Emmy Award for Non-Fiction for Live from the Clinic, a pioneering interactive medical series produced by Maverick Television for Channel 4.
- 2015: Don't Stop the Music, advocating for improved music education in schools, was nominated for the International Digital Emmy for Non-Fiction.
- 2019: Commissioned and executive produced Missed Call, which won the BAFTA TV Award for Best Short Form Programme, notable as the first film primarily made for YouTube to win an academy award and shot entirely on an iPhone X.
- 2020: One of his co-commissions with CBC, Take Me to Prom, won the Canadian academy award for Best Short Documentary at the 8th Canadian Screen Awards in 2020.
- 2021: Commissioned and executive produced They Saw the Sun First, which won the BAFTA for Best Short Form Programme.

== Other Activities ==
Gee served as an advisor on the UK government's Byron Review of Children and New Technology (child safety with regard to internet and video games) published in March 2008.

Gee maintains a personal blog, Simple Pleasures part 4, where he writes on creativity, media, and culture.

In June 2025, he took part in an international event in Paris dedicated to duanju, the emerging format of vertical mobile fiction, organized by the association Studio Phocéen.

== Memberships and Affiliations ==
Gee has served on BAFTA's Television and Interactive Entertainment committees, and is a voting member of the European Film Academy. He has held board positions at ICA's The Club, Culture24, the Phoenix Cinema and Hot Cherry. He previously served as a non-executive director of Wordia with Michael Birch. He is a non-executive director of Blue Door.

== Honours ==
He was made a Freeman of the City of London through the Worshipful Company of Cutlers in 2006, became a Liveryman in 2009 and joined the Court in 2026.

Gee was awarded an honorary fellowship from Norwich University of the Arts in 2020 "for services to the UK Broadcast and Interactive Media industry".

== Productions ==
Adam Gee's multiplatform/transmedia productions include:

- Bedtime Live
- Big Art Mob
- Big Art Project
- Big Fish Fight, a campaign led by Hugh Fearnley-Whittingstall
- Don't Stop the Music, a campaign with James Rhodes
- Embarrassing Bodies
- 4thought.tv
- The Great British Property Scandal, a campaign led by George Clarke with Phil Spencer and Jon Snow
- Jamie's DreamSchool featuring Jamie Oliver
- Landshare
- Live from the Clinic, featuring Dr Christian Jessen and Dr Dawn Harper
- My Healthchecker
- One Born Every Minute
- Was It Something I Said? with David Mitchell
- Quotables
- Sexperience, a sex education project
- The Sexperience 1000, a data visualiser
- Surgery Live, a collaboration with Wellcome Trust
- Osama Loves
- Empire's Children
- Picture This, a collaboration with Flickr
- Medicine Chest, a collaboration with Royal Botanic Gardens, Kew
- Breaking the News, a collaboration with ITN
- Lost Generation, a collaboration with the Imperial War Museum, London
- 4mations - online hub for animation with Aardman Animations

Adam Gee's short form video projects as Executive Producer/Commissioner include:

- Brittle Bone Rapper
- Tattoo Twists
- The Black Lesbian Handbook
- My Secret Tattoo
- 24 Hour Party Politics - with Bez of the Happy Mondays
- Futurgasm
- Drones in Forbidden Zones
- Circus Girls
- WTF is Cosplay?
- Body Mods
- L.A. Vice
- Naked & Invisible, with double world body painting champion Carolyn Roper
- Young & Minted: I Won the Lottery

Adam Gee's other documentary commissions/productions include:

- Vanished: The Surrey Schoolgirl - with Martin Bright
- Missed Call, the first documentary shot on an iPhone X
- Take Me to Prom
- Sorry I Shot You - with Stana, about restorative justice
- Social Media Addicts Anonymous
- Travelling on Trash, about plastic pollution in the Mississippi River
- Absent from our Own Wedding, about proxy marriage in Montana
- In Your Face: Confronting tattoo prejudice
- Pure O, about an extreme form of OCD
- How to Save a Tribe: the women who rescued the Samaritans - with Leon McCarron
- Violet Vixen
