= Alfie Dennen =

British creative technologist, artist (born 1976)

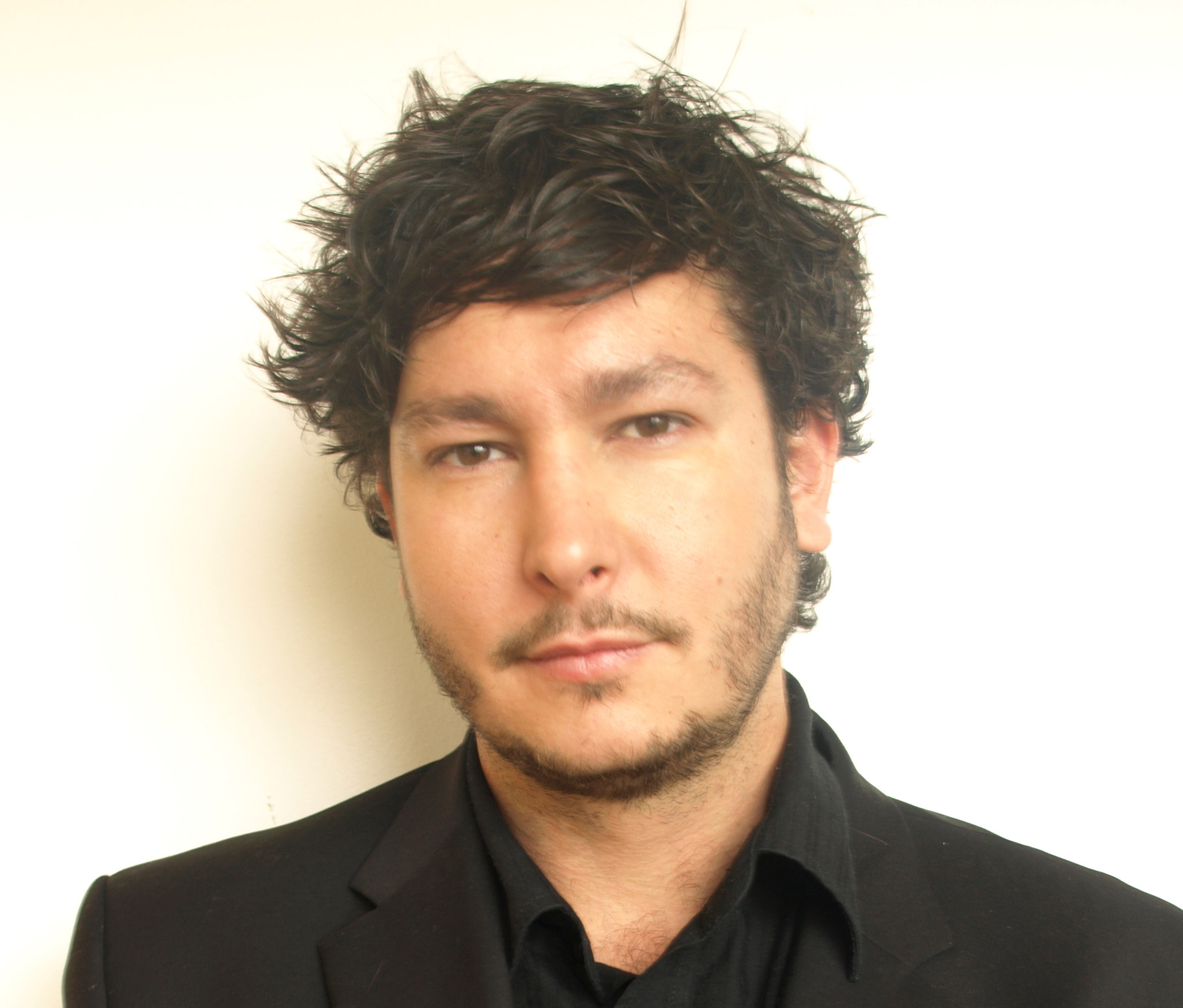
- Alfie Dennen
- Born: March 25, 1976 (age 50)
- Occupations: Technologist, artist

Alfie Dennen (born March 25, 1976) is a British creative technologist, artist, and founder of several websites dedicated to social activism. He is known for projects that combine technology and activism, and in the 2020s has worked on introducing artificial intelligence (AI) tools into UK government workflows.

== Projects ==
Dennen co-founded the mobile blogging platform Moblog, formerly MoblogUK, in November 2003. Commercial users of the service included Ronan Keating, Bloc Party, Greenpeace, Elbow, Imogen Heap, Max Clifford, Channel 4, Oxfam, Amnesty International and Comic Relief. The service gained prominence in 2005 when a widely circulated camera-phone image from the 7 July 2005 London bombings was posted to Moblog; the photograph, taken by Eliot Ward and showing Adam Stacey in a smoke-filled carriage, became one of the most referenced early examples of eyewitness mobile imagery of the attacks.

Dennen responded to the attacks by creating the website We're Not Afraid. The site's message was one of a public uniting against terrorism by refusing to sacrifice freedom in response to fear. Within days of the 7 July 2005 bombings, around 3,500 images had been submitted to the site. The site was the subject of a BBC documentary, and coverage included Sky News, Channel 5, ABC World News Tonight and The New York Times.

Dennen's "Stopped Clocks" project attempted to collate images of stopped public clocks and campaign to get them working again. The campaign was featured on BBC News, London Tonight and The One Show.

In 2008, Dennen launched two art projects involving the creation of map-based images using mobile photography and GPS tracking. The first, in October 2008, was a treasure hunt around London to find photographs by James Nachtwey. Run in conjunction with the think tank Demos and XDRTB.org, the competition raised awareness of extensively drug-resistant tuberculosis (XDR-TB). The second project, Britglyph, invited people from across the UK to build a nationwide geoglyph by placing rocks at specific GPS coordinates around the country and uploading photos of themselves doing so. The resulting image was based on John Harrison's marine chronometer.

On 31 August 2012, Dennen re-launched the Big Art Mob project after it moved out from its initial parent and funder Channel 4 in the United Kingdom. The revamped site expanded its focus from mapping the United Kingdom's public art to mapping public art worldwide.

As part of the London 2012 Cultural Olympiad, Dennen co-created Bus-Tops (with Paula Le Dieu), a collaborative public art installation of 30 red-and-black LED screens on the roofs of bus shelters across 20 London boroughs that displayed artworks submitted by the public and invited artists.

=== Post-2012 work ===
In 2018 Dennen co-designed the satirical board game Evil Corp, launched on Kickstarter and later covered in the technology press for its critique of the power of Big Tech CEOs.

==== UK government and AI (Redbox) ====
By 2024–25 Dennen was a Senior Product Manager in AI Enablement at the Department for Business and Trade (DBT). His work at DBT has included Redbox@DBT, a DBT-specific instance developed on the open-source Redbox codebase originated by the Cabinet Office’s Incubator for AI (i.AI). Dennen has presented Redbox@DBT to cross-government audiences, including a session during Analysis in Government Month 2025. DBT has published blog posts describing pilots and early outcomes from its departmental Redbox instance.

== Awards ==
Moblog collaborated with Channel 4 on the Big Art Mob, which won the On the Move Award at the Royal Television Society Innovation Awards 2007. It was described as "a creative project that encourages almost everyone to get involved... a large-scale example of television production in your pocket. Anyone can become a contributor or commentator, as long as they’ve got a mobile camera phone." The project also won the MediaGuardian Innovation Award for community engagement in 2008, and it received three BAFTA nominations across the interactive and mobile categories that year.

Moblog also collaborated with ShoZu on Britglyph, which won the Experimental and Innovation Award at the Webbys 2009.

On 14 August 2009, Arts Council England and LOCOG announced that Dennen's Bus-Tops project (in collaboration with Paula Le Dieu) was shortlisted for the London award in the Artists Taking the Lead public art competition. The project received a £5,000 development grant to further develop the proposal alongside four other shortlisted entries; on 22 October 2009, the Arts Council announced that Bus-Tops had won the competition, securing £500,000 to deliver the work for the 2012 Cultural Olympiad.
