= Tigger's Honey Hunt =

2000 video game

- North American PlayStation cover art
- Developer: Doki Denki Studio
- Publishers: NA: NewKidCo; EU: Ubi Soft; WW: Disney Interactive (PC)
- Director: Pascal Stradella
- Designer: Marc Albinet
- Programmer: Jean Christophe Capdevila
- Artist: Pierre Bracconi
- Composers: Guillaume Saurel; Philippe Codecco
- Series: Winnie the Pooh
- Platforms: PlayStation, Nintendo 64, Windows
- Release: PlayStation: NA: September 27, 2000; EU: October 27, 2000; Nintendo 64: NA: October 27, 2000; EU: April 6, 2001; Windows: NA: March 6, 2001; EU: February 1, 2004
- Genre: Platform
- Modes: Single-player, multiplayer

Tigger's Honey Hunt is a platform video game based on the Winnie the Pooh franchise that was released in 2000 for the PlayStation and Nintendo 64. The game was developed by Doki Denki Studio for Disney Interactive, who co-released the game on home consoles through NewKidCo in North America, and through Ubi Soft in Europe. A Microsoft Windows version was published by Disney Interactive as Disney's Tigger's Honey Hunt 3D Adventure in 2001. Tigger's Honey Hunt is a 2.5D platformer in which the player controls Tigger through six platforming levels interspersed with three minigames. In platforming levels, Tigger aims to collect honey pots while avoiding enemies and obstacles. The majority of the gameplay is single player only, with minigames allowing for multiple players.

Tigger's Honey Hunt began development as a PlayStation title in early 2000, before Doki Denki subcontracted Rivage Games to create a port for the N64. Both studios were given tight deadlines so that the game's release could coincide with The Tigger Movie. The PlayStation version completed development in nine months, with concurrent development of the N64 version lasting four months. Upon release, the game received generally positive reviews from critics, who praised its presentation. Tigger's Honey Hunt was awarded the BAFTA Interactive Entertainment Award in the category of Children's Entertainment, as well as the Parents' Choice Award.

== Gameplay ==
Tigger racing the clock to finish the level in the shortest time

Tigger's Honey Hunt is a video game divided between six 2.5D platformer levels and three minigames, for a total of nine levels. Tigger traverses a two-dimensional side-scrolling path, viewed from the side in 2.5D. Each platforming level contains 100 honey pots to collect, and Tigger must find a required number of honey pots to complete a level. Some enemies such as bats, crows, and woozles can be defeated by jumping on them, but others like heffalumps can only be avoided.

There is one friend in each of the platform levels who needs Tigger's help finding a hidden item; helping them will unlock a time trial challenge for that level. When returning to the level with time trial unlocked, a clock will appear at the start of the level. Collecting it will start the time trial, in which the player races toward the end of the level and is given a pass or fail grade by Owl. Hidden in each level are photograph pieces bearing a picture of Roo, Rabbit, or Pooh, with four pieces each per character. Roo's photograph pieces can be collected from the start, while Rabbit and Pooh's photograph pieces will not appear until the player has collected all 100 honey pots and completed the Time Trial challenge respectively. Collecting all four of a character's photograph pieces in a level will unlock a piece of artwork in the Photo Album menu.

Apart from the platforming levels, there are three minigames that are based on classic games and can be played with other players. "Rabbit Says" is a variation of the game Simon Says. "Pooh Stick" is a game of throwing sticks into a river and allowing the different water currents to push them to the finishing line. "Paper, Scissors, Owl" is a version of the game rock paper scissors. Beating the minigames will unlock new moves for Tigger to use in the main levels, including the ability to bounce higher and briefly hover in mid-air. Using the new abilities allows players to discover hidden areas in the game's levels.

The PlayStation and Windows versions feature full voice acting, along with full-motion video (FMV) clips from various Winnie the Pooh animated media that play before the start of each level. The Nintendo 64 version features only limited voice acting and no FMV clips.

== Plot ==
Winnie the Pooh goes outside his house to eat some honey, when Tigger bounces in on him. Pooh announces that he is planning a party for everyone but needs to collect more honey pots for it, so he asks Tigger to help him get more, which he agrees to, despite his dislike for honey.

The game ends with Tigger's attempts in collecting honey for the party proving futile, as Pooh eats all of it. Tigger seeks advice from Owl, who suggests that he talk to Christopher Robin. Upon learning the situation, Christopher helps Tigger and Pooh make different kinds of food for the party, including a big cake. The party is a big success, and Christopher Robin congratulates Pooh and Tigger for making it possible.

== Development ==
Tigger's Honey Hunt was created as a tie-in for The Tigger Movie, which was released theatrically six months prior to the game's release. The game began development as a PlayStation title in early 2000. The title was developed by French animation and game development studio Doki Denki Studio, who were under contract for Disney Interactive. The 45-person team was given a tight deadline of just nine months to complete the game from start to finish so the game's release could coincide with The Tigger Movie. While developing the PlayStation game, Doki Denki contracted Saint-Quentin-en-Yvelines based Rivage Games to create a port for the N64. Rivage Games began development in April, working inside the same office building as Doki Denki while they developed the PlayStation version of the game. Rivage Games submitted Tigger's Honey Hunt to Nintendo for approval four months later, who in-turn approved it in four weeks. Notably, while the N64 version of the game had faster load times thanks to its cartridge based media, it lacks the video clips and voice acting present in the other versions due to hardware limitations of the N64 Game Pak. The game was also translated into 11 languages.

NewKidCo, who published the home console version in North America, presented the game at E3 2000. In a press release, Hank Kaplan, President of NewKidCo stated "Tigger's Honey Hunt engages children in an adventure in which they are encouraged to interact with their favorite characters and in the process, learn basic lessons". The press release also stated that the game would be available on PlayStation and N64 in August 2000, but it was not released until September and October, respectively.

== Release ==
Tigger's Honey Hunt was first released on the PlayStation on September 27, 2000, in North America. In October 2000, the PSX version released in Europe, and the N64 version of the game was shipped to stores in North America. The PC version of the game, which also went by the name Disney's Tigger's Honey Hunt 3D Adventure, was released on March 6, 2001, in North America. The PAL-region N64 version was released on April 6, 2001. The PlayStation version of the game was also classified for release in Australia in 2001. The game was re-released on October 8, 2002, for PlayStation as a three-pack titled Disney Action Games Collectors' Edition alongside A Bug's Life and Tarzan. It was re-released again on November 22, 2002, as part of a two-pack of Disney PlayStation games alongside Donald Duck: Quack Attack. The PC version was later released in February 2004 in Europe.

In the USA, the game received a national marketing campaign including television and print advertisements. A 30-second commercial featuring gameplay was shown on TV, Disney Cruise Lines and hotels, and as a preview on the VHS release of The Tigger Movie. The VHS release also featured a $3.00 rebate for the game. The game was also promoted on the packaging of Mattel's "Ask me More Eeyore" toy. A demo of the game was also included on the April 2001 demo disc from the Official U.S. PlayStation Magazine, alongside Championship Surfer and Power Spike Pro Beach Volleyball.

A spiritual successor titled Pooh and Tigger's Hunny Safari was later released for the Game Boy Color, with different minigames but otherwise sharing much of the same story.

== Reception ==
Reception

Review scores
Publication	Score	
Publication	N64	PS
64	92/100	N/A
AllGame	3.5/5	2.5/5
Computer and Video Games	2/5	N/A
IGN	7.3/10	6.5/10
N64 Magazine	36%	N/A
Nintendo Power	7.6/10	N/A
Official Nintendo Magazine	81%	N/A
PlayStation Official Magazine – UK	N/A	7/10

Awards
Publication	Award
BAFTA	BAFTA Interactive Entertainment Award
Parents' Choice Foundation	Parents' Choice Approved Award

The game received generally positive reception from critics upon release. Several reviewers complimented the game's presentation, in particular its graphics and animation. Jeff Kapalka of the Syracuse Herald-Journal called the stages "the prettiest levels I've seen in quite a while", and 64 Magazine described the game as being the most faithful adaptation of a cartoon to a video game they had seen. Multiple critics also praised the game's controls. Writing for the Winnipeg Free Press, Todd Mowatt gave the game a score of B+, stating "Tigger's Honey Hunt really knows what it wants to be — a kid's game. In a time when violence in gaming is at the forefront of the media (even if undeserving), it's nice to see a whimsical, happy title emerge just for the sake of being."

Negative critiques of the game was directed toward the gameplay, as well as the sound design on the N64 version. Several critics stated that the gameplay lacked depth and found the levels to be too easy, making the game only suitable for children. Multiple sources criticized the lack of voice acting in the N64 version of the game, with Nintendo Power writing that "the game relies heavily on text, and more spoken dialogue... would have been more appropriate for its audience". Nintendo themselves stated that the lack of voiced dialogue and the amount of reading required "might pose a challenge for young players." N64 Magazine described the lack of voiceover and animated scenes as a detriment to the N64 version, making it feel as if the game had not yet completed development.

According to Playthings, the PlayStation version of the game was the 5th best-selling "interactive children's entertainment title" based on units sold in October 2000. In July 2001, Hyper listed it as the second best selling full price N64 game in Australia. Tigger's Honey Hunt was awarded the BAFTA Interactive Entertainment Award in 2001 in the category of Children's Entertainment. Both the PlayStation and N64 versions of the game received the Spring 2001 Parents' Choice Approved Award from the Parents' Choice Foundation.

== See also ==
- List of Disney video games

== Bibliography ==
- Gannon, Paul (December 2000). "Tigger's Honey Hunt". 64 Magazine. No. 48. Paragon Publishing.
- "Tigger's Honey Hunt" (PDF). NewKidCo. 2000.
