= The Cross (Barre, Massachusetts) =

Geoglyph park in Barre, Massachusetts, United States

- God's Wisdom
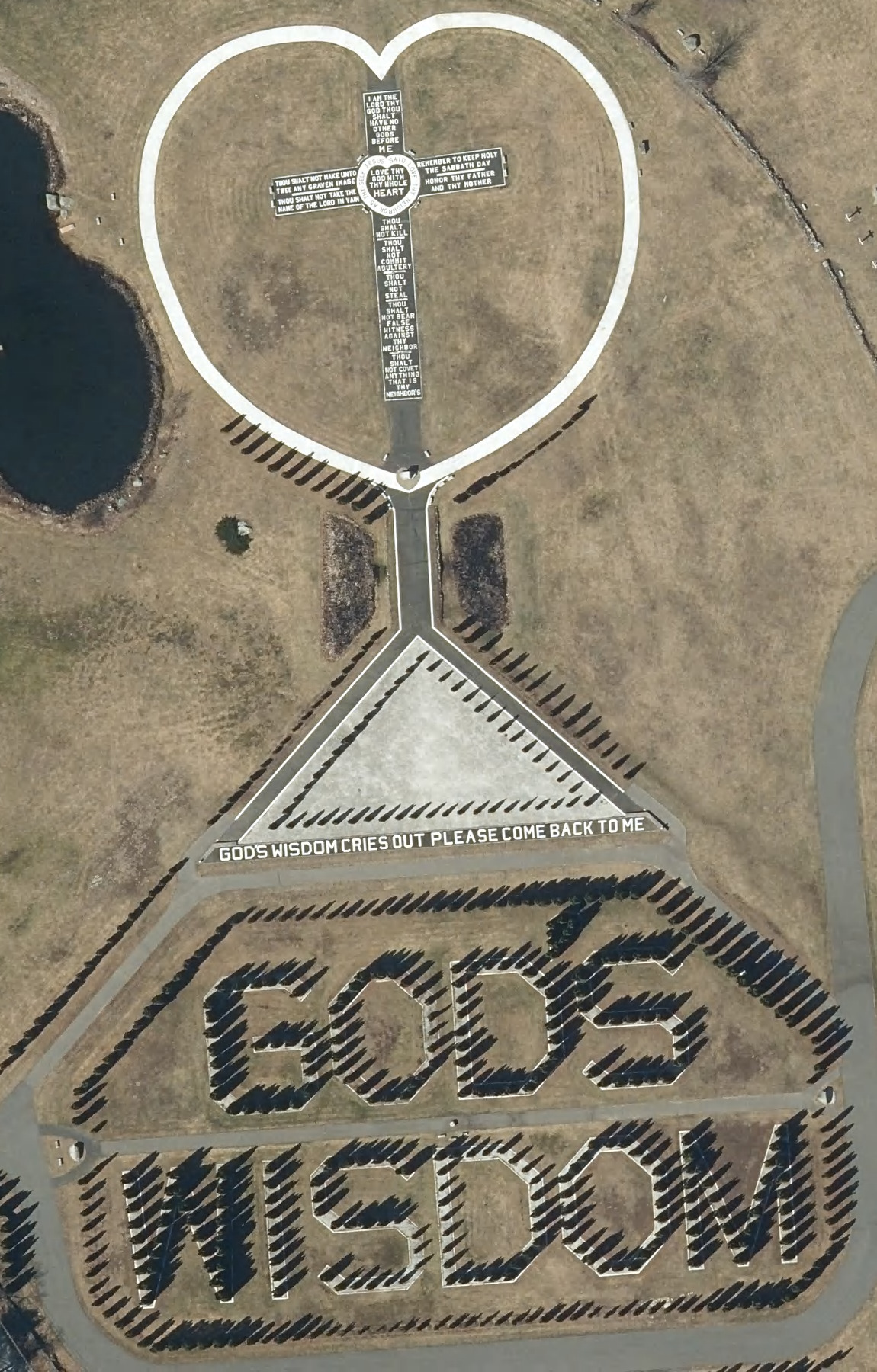
- Aerial photograph of site in 2023
- Interactive map of The Cross
- Location: Barre, Massachusetts, United States
- Coordinates: 42°28′01″N 72°05′20″W
- Established: March 16, 1989
- Opened: 1992
- Founder: John P. Harty Sr.
- Open: Every day sun up to sun down
- Website: www.thecrossinbarre.com

The Cross, also known as The Barre Cross, God's Wisdom, or The Ten Commandments on Earth, is a large privately created geoglyph park in Barre, Massachusetts, United States. John P. Harty Sr. started the project in 1989 and it opened to the public in 1992. Main features include a large asphalt cross on the ground with the Ten Commandments written on it, trees spelling out the text "God's Wisdom", and a holy well.

== Inspiration ==
Tool dealer John P. Harty Sr. said that at the age of 67 when he was saying the Lord's Prayer lying in his bed around midnight on March 16, 1989, he heard a clear voice from God giving him a set of instructions to create a large monument including the Ten Commandments and "Love thy neighbor as thyself" written on a cross on his farmland. Harty claimed that through a series of visions, he learned several details about what to create, including a pond, a well, a message made of trees, and dimensions for the construction. After completing the main project in 1992, Harty opened it to the public saying that he expected many people would soon come to see his cross.

== Features ==
=== Cross ===
The cross is constructed of 5-inch (13 cm) thick asphalt measuring 200 feet (61 m) long and 25 feet (8 m) wide, with the crossbar 150 feet (46 m) in length. A version of the Ten Commandments are painted on the cross with white traffic paint, with each letter 3 feet (1 m) high and 2 feet (0.6 m) wide. The letters were painted by Harty's daughter Noreen Mascroft over the course of eight weeks, and are visible from 20,000 feet (6,000 m) in the air. The crossbar is angled slightly due to a belief that Jesus was crucified with his left side higher.

=== Well ===
Following the instructions that Harty claims he received, he tapped a well which is now called Jacob's Well. Harty's granddaughter Amy Grandone said in 2025 that every day people come to the well, some with buckets, in part due to stories of healings associated with the water there. Johanna Glazier, another granddaughter of Harty, said "some people claim they've been cured of certain sicknesses" after drinking the water.

=== God's Wisdom text ===
The words "God's Wisdom" are spelled out using arborvitae evergreen trees and white stone, so that the text is visible from the air even in the winter. According to Glazier, they grew twice as tall as normal despite no special care or watering.

=== Other features ===
- An information shed that includes images of the cross's construction as well as messages of faith.
- A heart-shaped praying circle that surrounds the cross.
- A triangular monument that symbolizes the Trinity.
- Fruit trees.
- A pond.
- Small stone benches to allow people to sit and reflect.
- A small family cemetery, which includes Harty's grave.
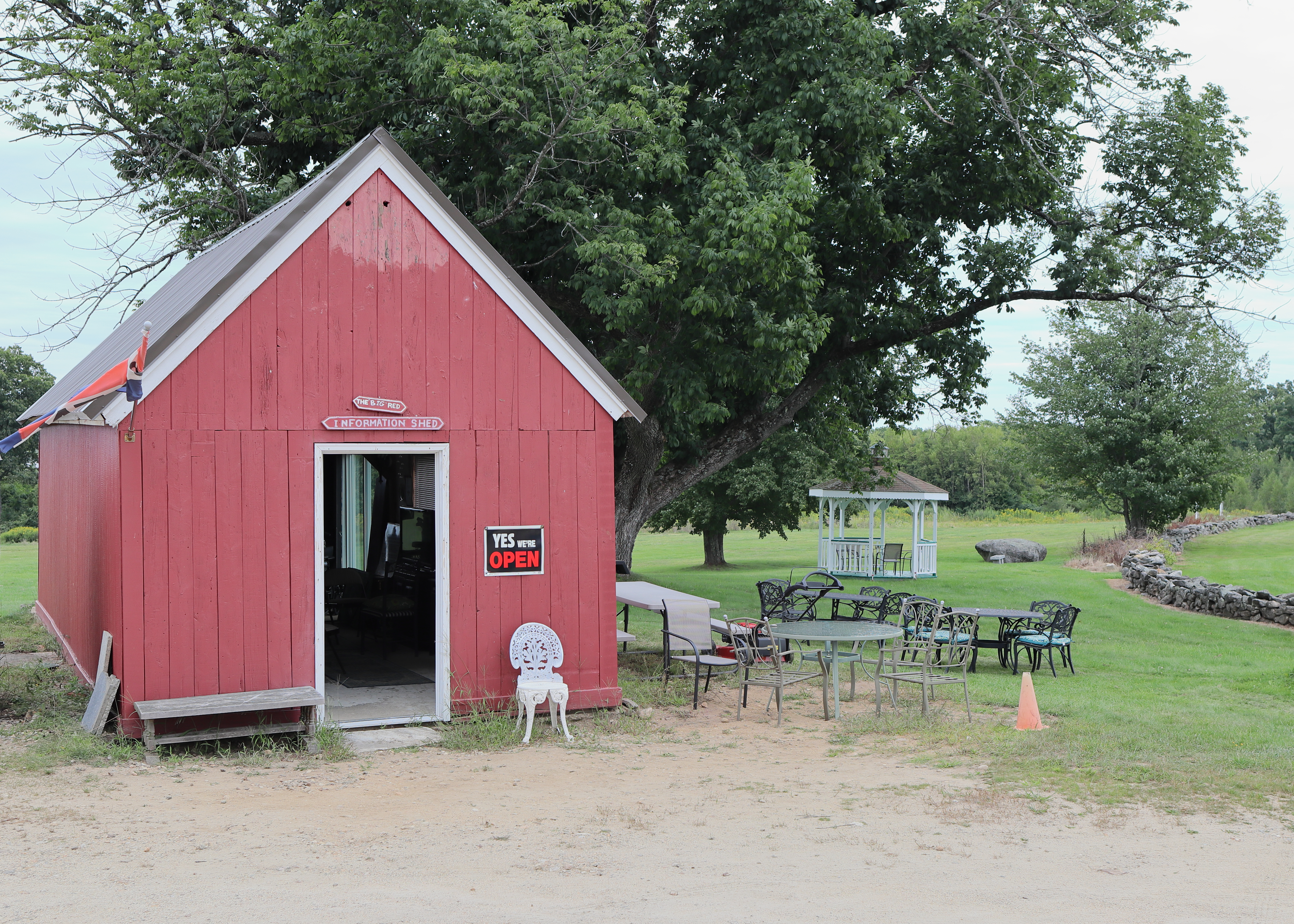
The Big Red Information Shed

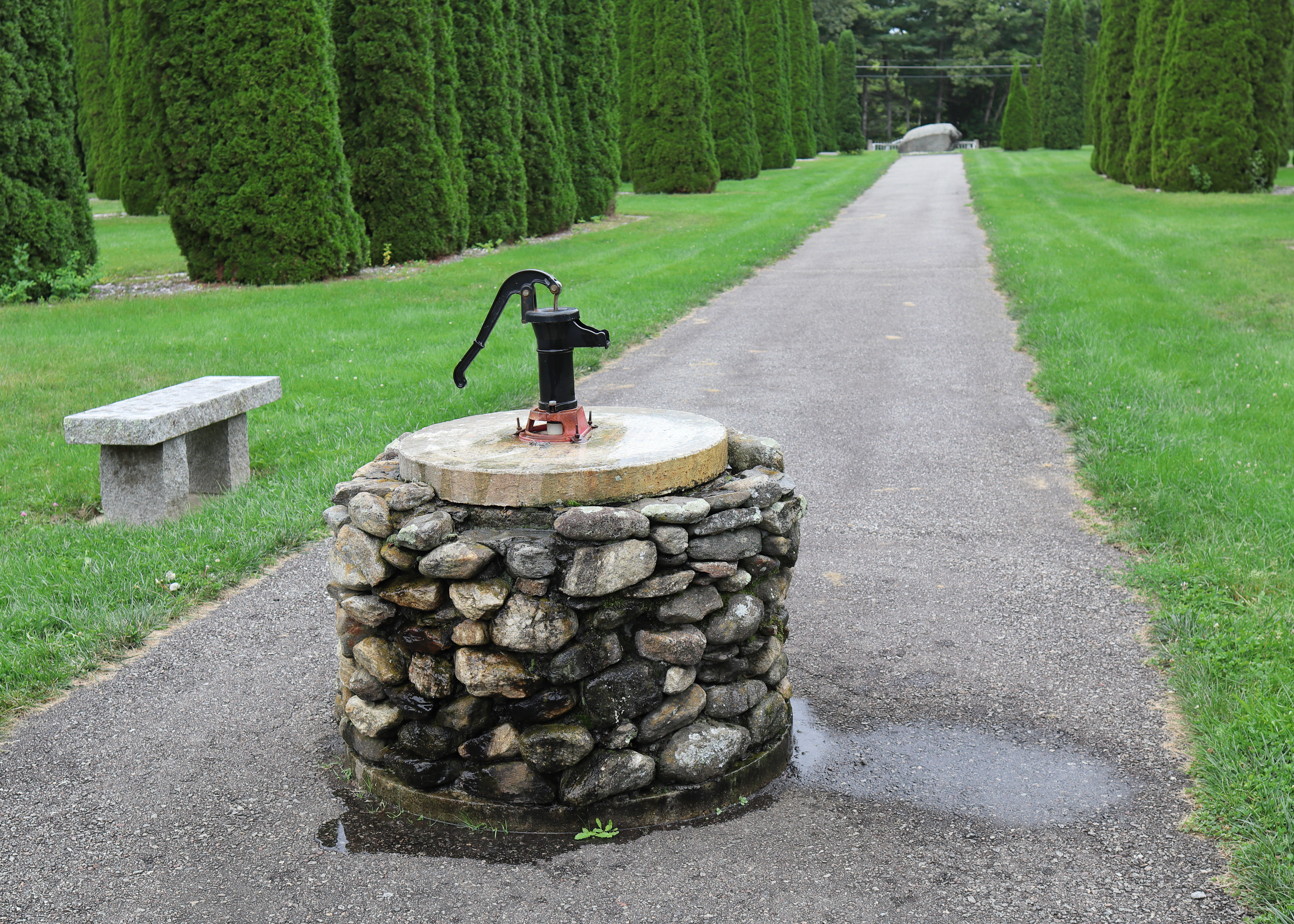
Jacob's Well

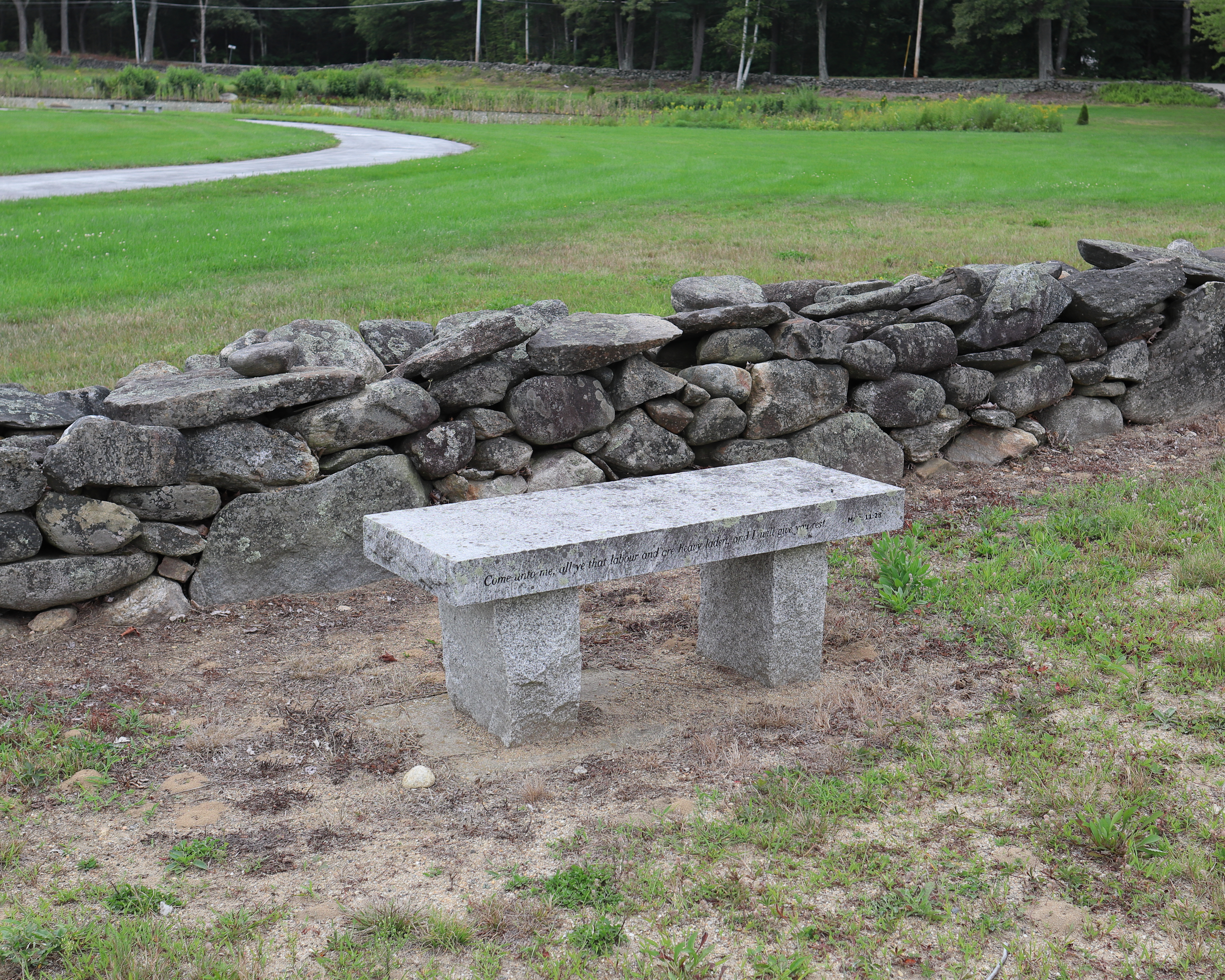
Stone bench with engraved scripture verse

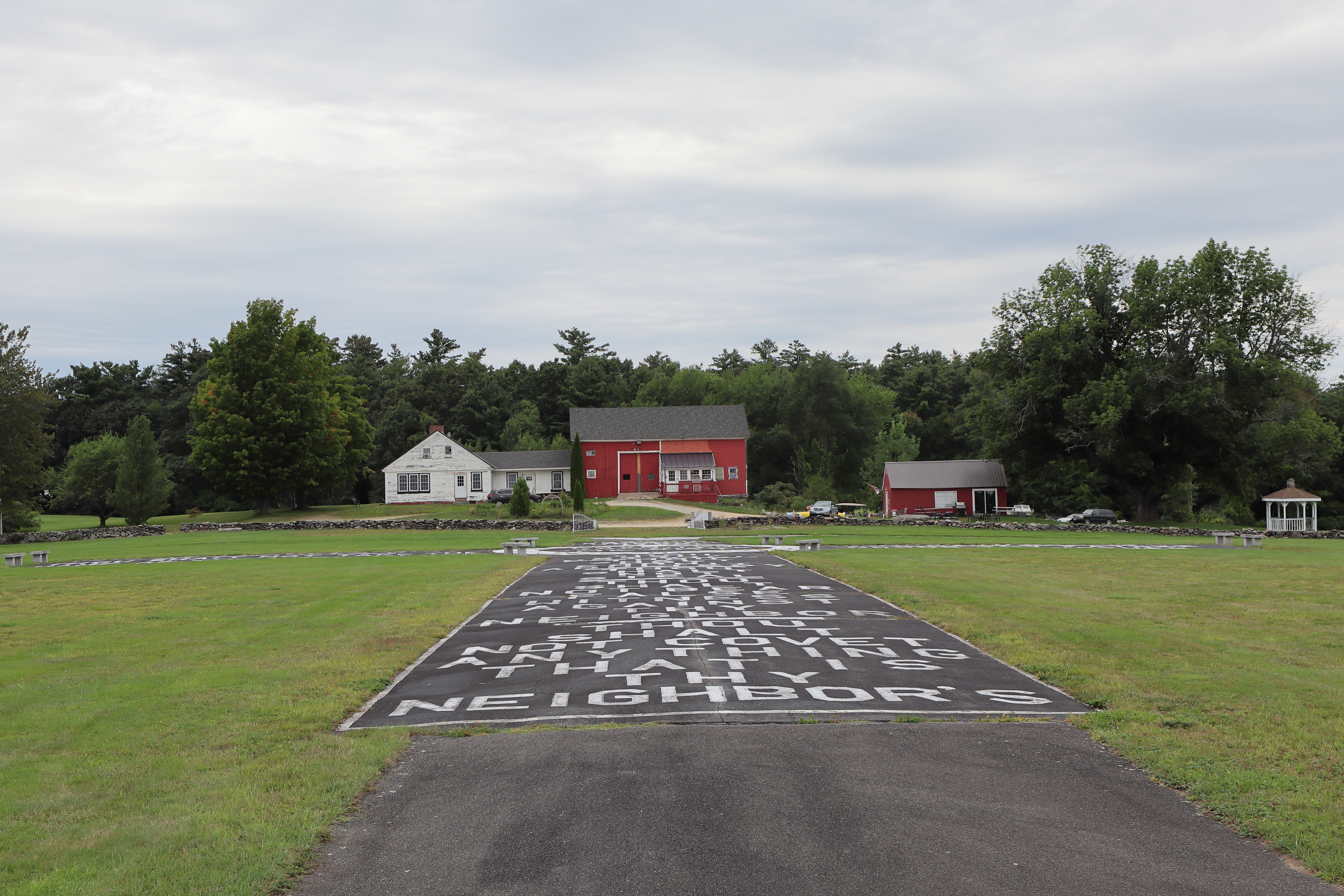
View from cross's base

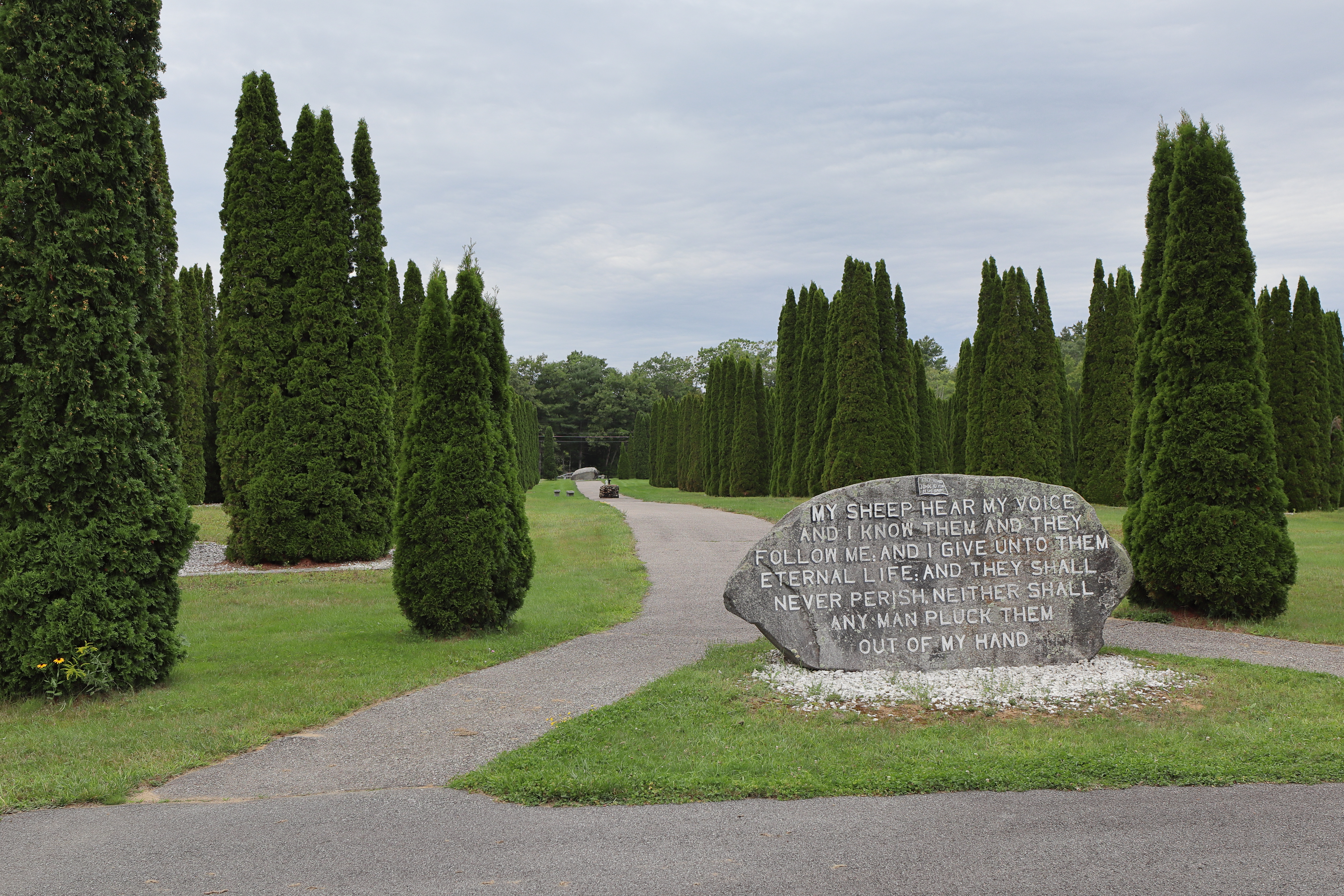
Split boulder with verses written on it

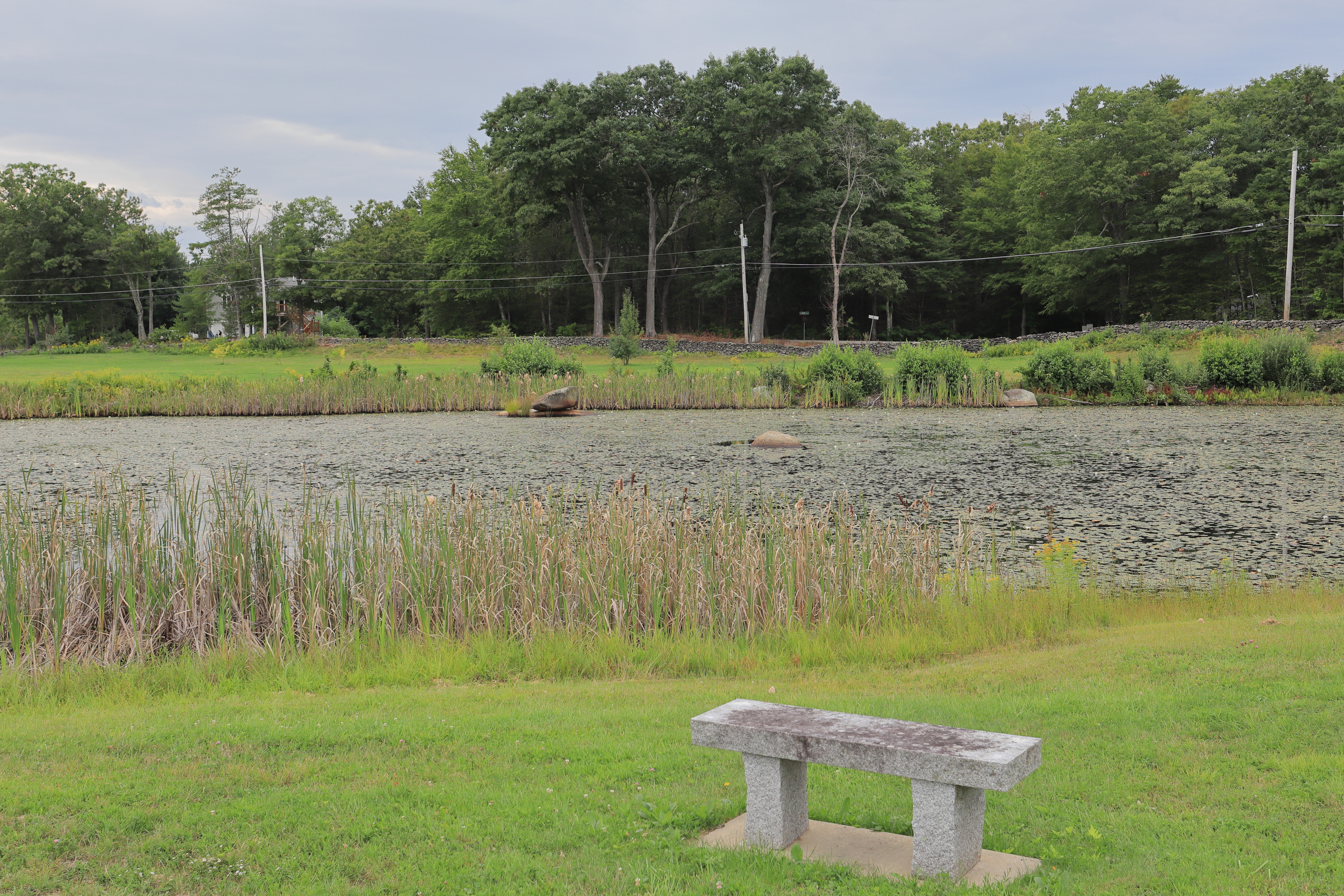
The pond

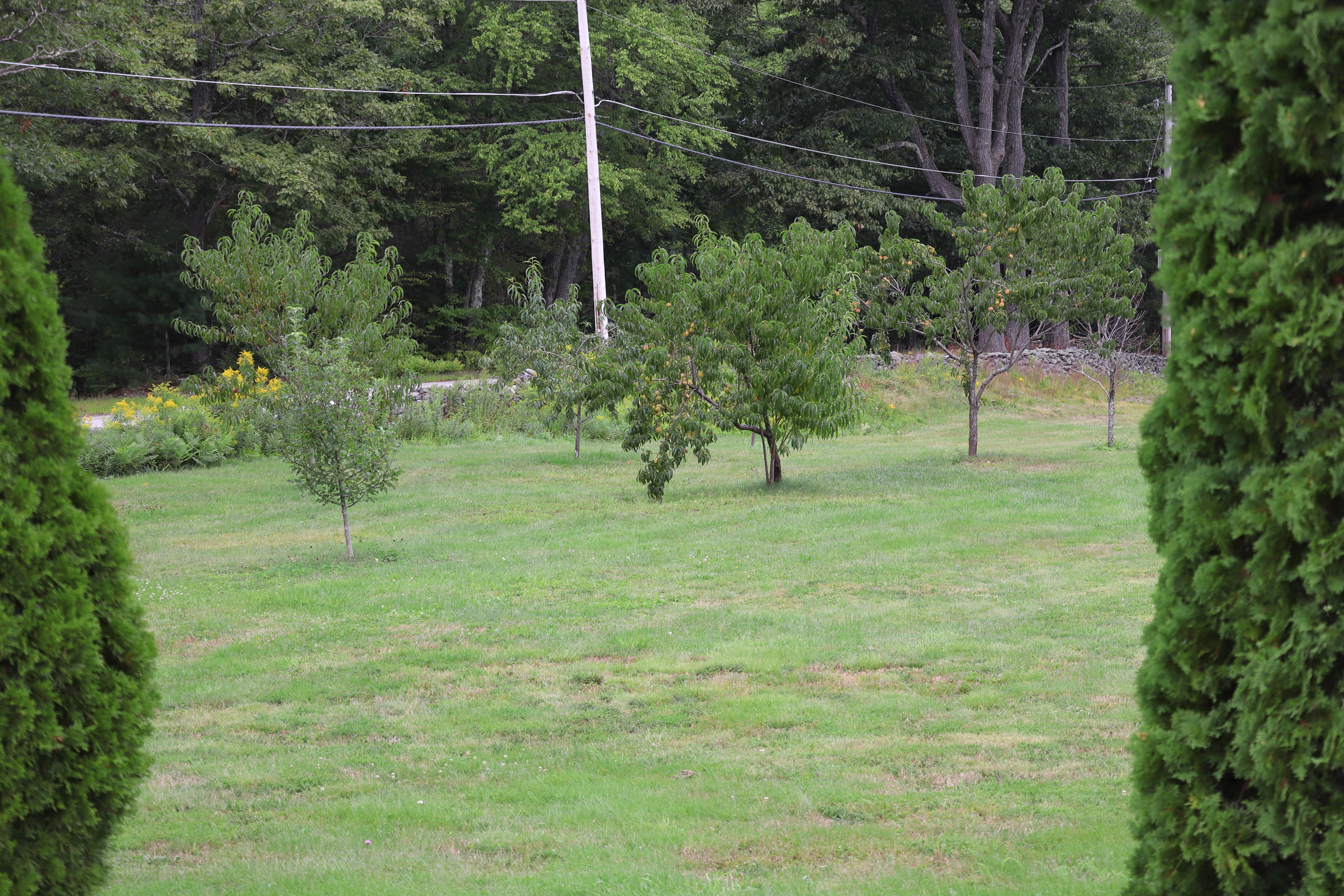
Fruit trees

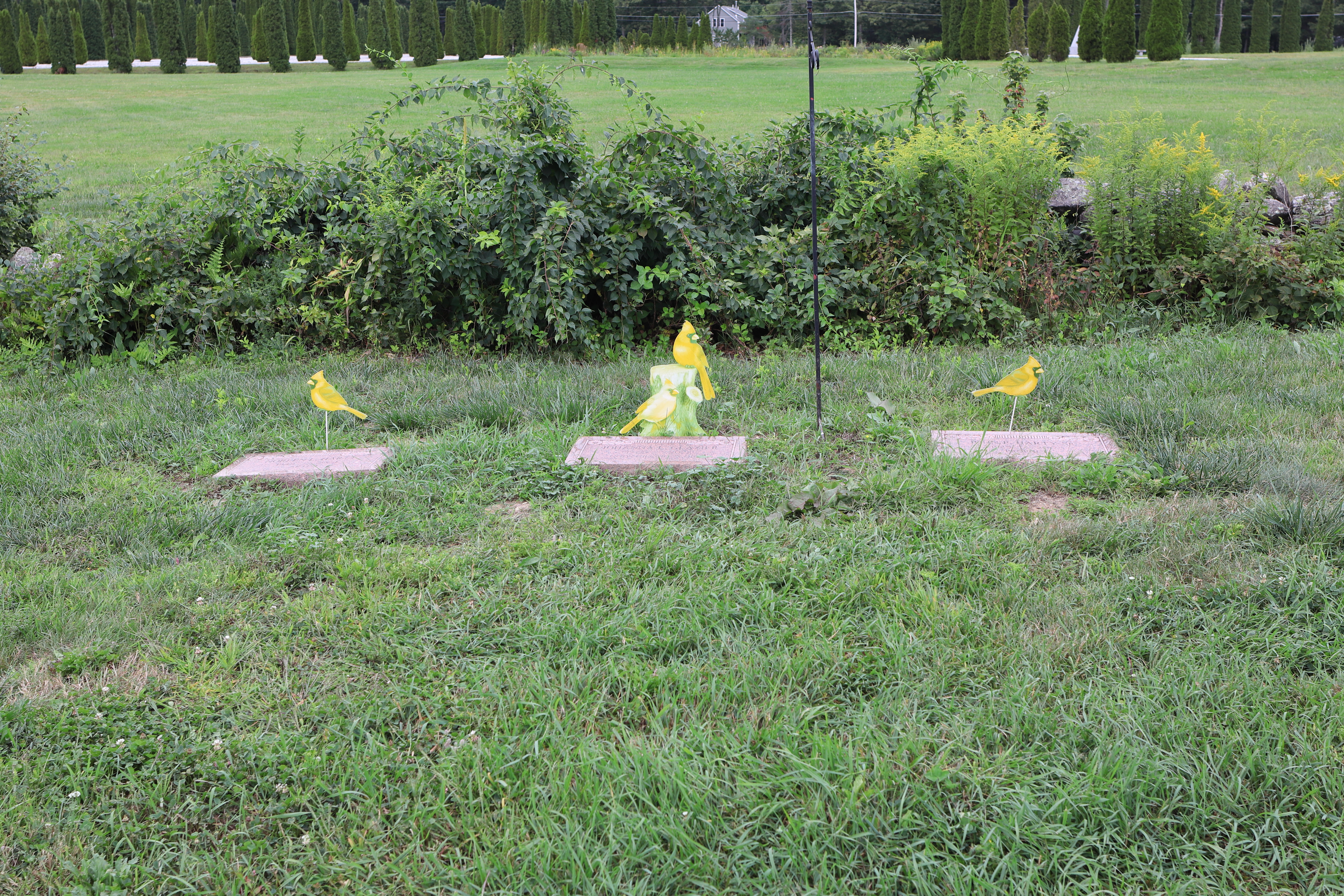
Harty family cemetery

== Response ==
Visitors from around the world have traveled to see The Cross. There has been little vandalism over the years, though the site's owners needed to restrict visiting to daylight hours so that loud groups would not disturb their neighbors. The Cross has no admission fee and is open on every day of the year for anybody to come visit. It has been the site of several weddings and baptisms.
