= Boha geoglyphs =

Geoglyphs found in the Thar Desert, India

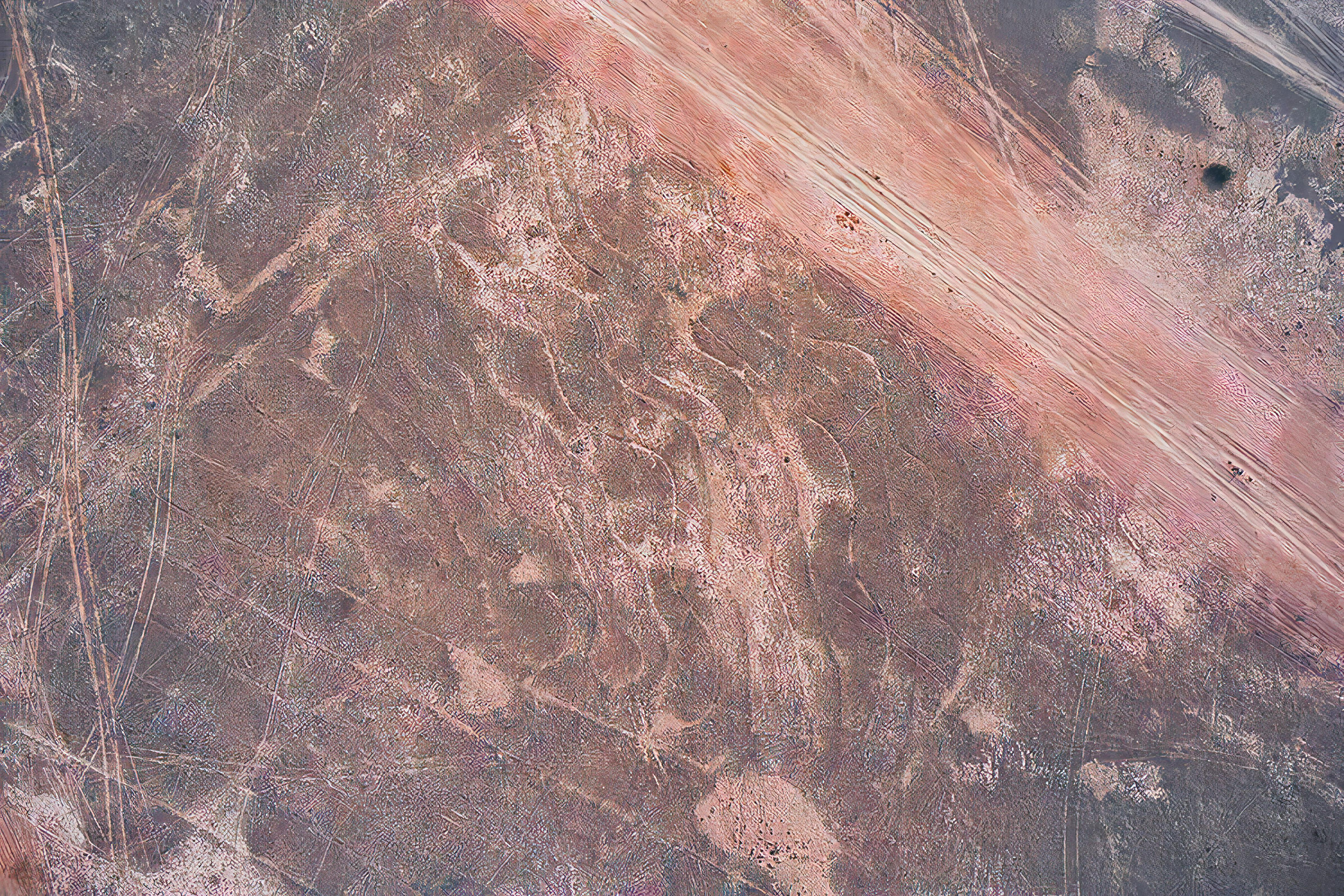
- The Boha geoglyphs
- Interactive map of Boha geoglyphs
- 27°08′40″N 70°32′02″E
- Location: Jaisalmer District, Rajasthan, India
- Region: Great Indian Desert

History
- Discovered: 2014

The Boha geoglyphs or Great Indian Desert geoglyph are a group of large geoglyphs made in the soil in the Thar Desert of Rajasthan, India. Several sites were found located around the city of Jaisalmer, marked by geometrical lines resembling geoglyphs. The lines that make up these figures are stripes etched into the ground, ranging up to 10 centimeters deep (4 in) and spreading 20 to 50 cm wide (8-20 in). The sizes of the glyphs are so large that it is believed that its creators must not have been able to view them in its entirety. The largest of these glyphs are in the vicinity of the village of Boha near Jaiselmer. The Boha geoglyph is made of a succession of concentric and linear outlines and spans over 100,000 square metres, making it far larger than the Nazca Lines geoglyph in southern Peru, or any other known geoglyph. The geoglyphs were discovered by French researchers Carlo Oetheimer and Yohann Oetheimer, initially using Google Earth.

In 2021, the Oetheimers published their findings of field research at Boha, giving an estimate of at least 150 years for the age of the geoglyph.

According to the 2011 Population Census, Boha tehsil is a medium-sized village in the Jaisalmer district of Rajasthan.

== Discovery ==
The geoglyphs were discovered by a pair of independent French researchers, Carlo and Yohann Oetheimer. They were spotted using Google Earth, during a virtual survey of the Great Indian Desert. Inspections made with an unmanned aerial vehicle revealed some of the identified sites were furrows dug for tree plantations, but also helped reveal a cluster of line formations seemingly absent of trees. Two particular figures - a giant spiral and a serpent-shaped drawing - near the village of Boha stood out. What the project represents, and who created it, is not yet fully clear, but the researchers suggest the formations are not ancient but relatively recent geoglyphs which are perhaps at least 150 years old. They may also be contemporary with Hindu memorial stones found in the area.

== The geoglyphs ==
The geoglyphs are spread across eight sites in the Jaisalmer District of Rajasthan, India with the most prominent ones being near the village of Boha. It is the first such feature to be discovered in the Indian subcontinent. The largest geoglyph identified (Boha 1), the giant asymmetrical spiral, is made from a single looping line running for 12 kilometers, over an area 724 meters long by 201 meters wide. To the southwest of the huge vortex shape rests a serpentine geoglyph (Boha 2), composed of an 11-kilometer long line, which encompasses a serpent-like figure, a smaller spiral, and a long boustrophedon-style sequence of lines running back and forth. Other small geoglyphs can also be found in the Boha region (including a feature of meandering lines, called Boha 3), which in total includes around 48 kilometers of still visible lines today, which the researchers estimate may once have extended for about 80 kilometers. Due to their spatial contiguity the researchers believe they can be perceived as a sequential project.

On the eighth site in Boha, the father-son duo found four distinctive symbols. They were 20 inch wide lines having varying length and complexity.

=== Figure of Boha geoglyph ===
The two researchers found a series of these linear figures in Boha, a small village located around 40 km from Jaisalmer.

"Two remarkable geometrical figures: a giant spiral adjacent to an atypical serpent-shaped drawing, are connected with a cluster of sinuous lines. This triad extends over 20.8 ha and totals more than half of the 48 km of lines observed. Three memorial stones positioned at key points, give evidence that planimetric knowledge has been used to create this elaborate design," the paper states.

The researchers say that these geoglyphs are the largest ones discovered worldwide, and the first of their kind in the Indian subcontinent.

The largest figure was named Boha 1, and is a giant asymmetrical spiral made from a single line that loops and runs for around 12 kilometres. "The Boha 1 unit interpreted as a series of 12 eccentric ellipses, was revealed to be a huge spiral," the paper reads.

Boha 2 is a serpentine figure, around 11 km long. "By analogy these curves replicate a boustrophedon. This term refers to primitive writings whose lines can be read from left to right and then from right to left, in the same way a plow travels in a field. The inflection points in the lines generate a gap of 4.7–14 m between them," reads the paper.

Boha 3 and Boha 4 include a series of meandering lines, and "two iconographic units, adjacent to the previous ones, draw about 80 serpentine lines between 40 and 200 m long. Boha 3 forms a cluster of lines oriented towards the NE, immediately at the apex of the giant spiral.

Boha 4, on the other hand, is located about 50 meters away, SW of the boustrophedon. We experienced more difficulty achieving a precise mapping because many of these lines are heavily eroded. They have generally random sinuosities and adopt rhythmic undulations that look like braids in two areas".

While these figures stretched for about 48 kilometres, the researchers suggested that the distance might have once been around 80 km. The authors say, "The giant spiral and serpentine figure are definitely the major points of interest, closely connected to Boha 3, suggesting that all the other geoglyphs were created as a framework for this set. Due to their spatial contiguity, [these] can be perceived as a sequential project. We still have to identify the semantic relationships binding them. However, we can interpret the construction stages of this triptych, guided by their layout and the principle of simplicity."

The duo further explain, "Our observations suggest that a plow-type tool could have been used, possibly pulled by a camel on loose deposits, as commonly practiced by the Thar Desert farmers. This process, which does not exclude manual finishing, would explain the many inflection points in the lines. A small rock outcrop has been carved, indicating a concern to preserve the continuity of the line. These observations suggest that the creation of the Boha geoglyphs did not represent a considerable labor investment."

== Disagreement ==
Dr. Amal Kar, who has been studying the Thar Desert for nearly five decades, posits that the lines are natural structures. Abstract of an interview by The Hindu :

"The rocky terrain between Jaisalmer and Ramgarh in the north is home to a typical weathering feature, especially over the iron-rich sandstone and shale beds. Here, extreme aridity and high temperature lead to slow geochemical translocation of minerals for centuries, such that the heavier minerals like iron and manganese move away from the lighter minerals, which lead to the gradual formation of alternate bands of harder and softer mineral concentrations. With time the areas with softer materials get slowly eroded, while the harder ones stand out, producing the typical concentric or box-like geometric features."

Many similar natural structures can be found in the Thar Desert, with some just 10 km south from Boha being visible from satellite view.
