= Kanda Geoglyph =

Geoglyph in North Macedonia

Coordinates: 41°49′42″N 21°57′24″E

The Kanda Geoglyph is a geoglyph located in the central parts of North Macedonia, near the town of Sveti Nikole in the Ovce Pole area. Aerial photography has shown that the geoglyph is an oval-shaped hill and can only be seen perfectly from above. An aerial analysis using an infrared camera revealed a different composition of the soil in the hill compared to the surrounding soil.

In 2014 international researchers investigating the geoglyph concluded that the variance corresponds to the presence of a cavity inside the hill, presumed to be a few tens of meters beneath the surface. It is believed that the hill at Kanda is a cairn with an inner chamber or that the hill was raised on top of an existing hill to form the cairn, thus increasing its original height.

== Further analysis ==
Researchers, using an instrument to measure infrasound vibrations, realized there was the possibility of the existence of an underground water stream, deeper than the cavities of the tumulus. This hypothesis has not yet been confirmed through the use of geophysical survey techniques such as ground-penetrating radar.
