= Geoglyph =

Motif produced on the ground; observable only from a height

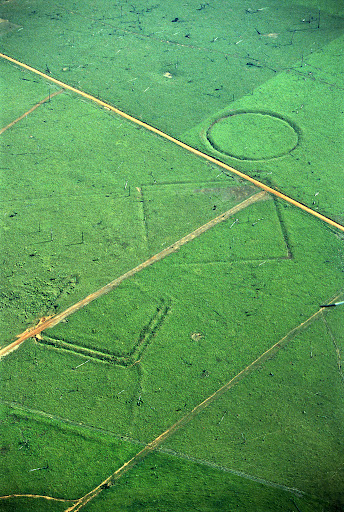
Geoglyphs on deforested land in the Amazon rainforest

A geoglyph is a large design or motif – generally longer than 4 metres (13 ft) – produced on the ground by durable elements of the landscape, such as stones, stone fragments, gravel, or earth. A positive geoglyph is formed by the arrangement and alignment of materials on the ground in a manner akin to petroforms, while a negative geoglyph is formed by removing part of the natural ground surface to create differently coloured or textured ground in a manner akin to petroglyphs.

Geoglyphs are generally a type of land art, and sometimes rock art. A hill figure is created on a slope, so that it can be seen from a distance.

== Ancient ==
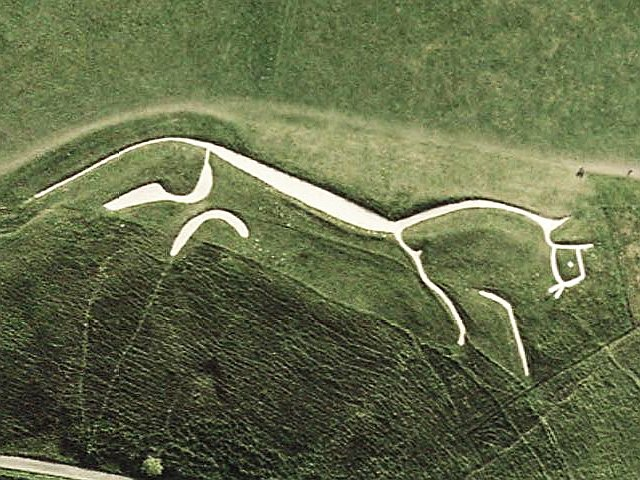
The prehistoric English hill figure of the Uffington White Horse

Arguably the most famous geoglyphs are the Nazca lines in Peru. The cultural significance of these geoglyphs for their creators remains unclear, despite many hypotheses.

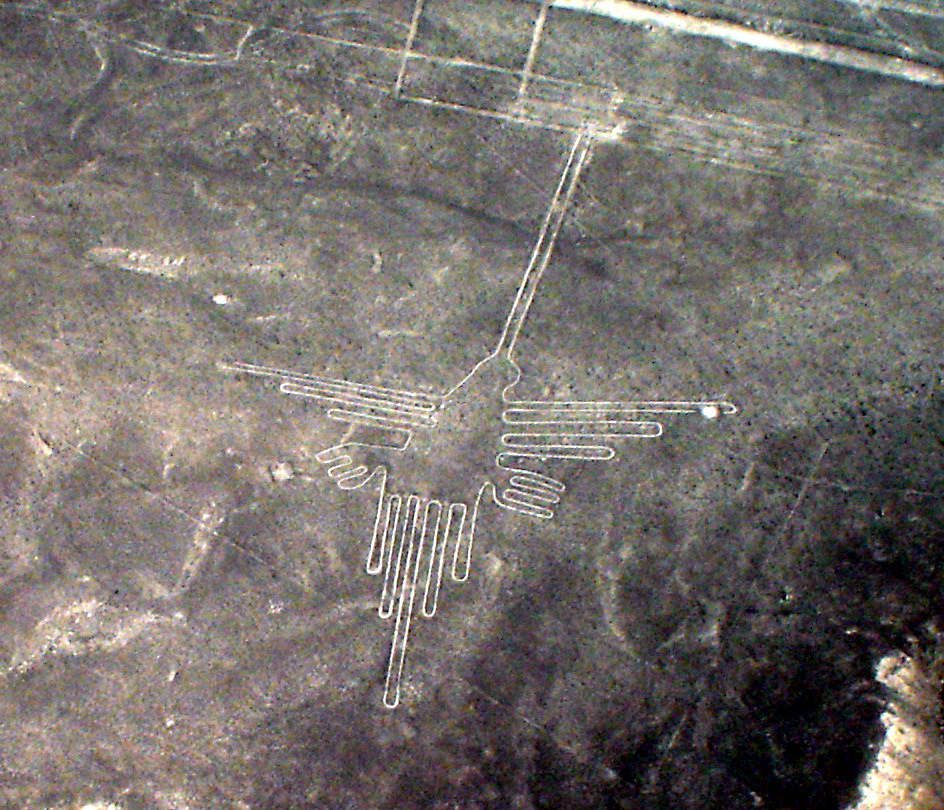
The Nazca Lines in Peru. This photograph shows a depiction of a hummingbird

Since the 1970s, numerous geoglyphs have been discovered on deforested land in the Amazon rainforest, Brazil, leading to claims about Pre-Columbian civilizations. Ondemar Dias is accredited with first discovering the geoglyphs in 1977 and Alceu Ranzi with furthering their discovery after flying over Acre.

Other areas with geoglyphs include Megaliths in the Urals, South Australia (Marree Man, which is not ancient, but rather a modern work of art, with mysterious origins), Western Australia and parts of the Great Basin Desert in the southwestern United States. Hill figures, turf mazes and the stone-lined labyrinths of Scandinavia, Iceland, Lappland and the former Soviet Union are types of geoglyphs.

The south of England has a number of equine and human figures cut into chalk hillsides. Examples include the Uffington White Horse, Cerne Abbas Giant, Westbury White Horse, and the Long Man of Wilmington. Some are ancient, others from the last few centuries.

=== Possible geoglyphs ===
The "Works of the Old Men" in Arabia, "stone-built structures that are far more numerous than (the) Nazca Lines, far more extensive in the area that they cover, and far older," have been described as geoglyphs by Amelia Sparavigna, a physics professor at Politecnico di Torino in Italy. The use of this term to describe these features is probably inaccurate, as recent research has shown that most were not constructed primarily as art, but were rather built to serve a range of purposes including burial sites and funerary customs, aiding in the trapping of migratory animals, and as cleared areas for camps, houses and animal enclosures.

== Contemporary ==
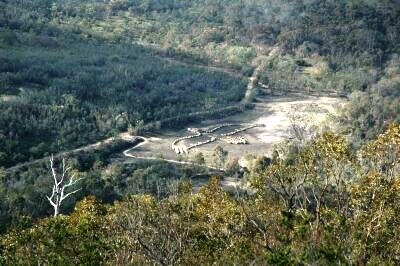
Bunjil geoglyph at the You Yangs, Lara, Australia, by Andrew Rogers. The creature has a wingspan of 100 metres and 1,500 tonnes of rock were used to construct it.

Not all geoglyphs are ancient. The Land Art movement created many new geoglyphs as well as other structures; perhaps the most famous example is Spiral Jetty by Robert Smithson. Many towns and cities in the Western United States use hillside letters (also known as "mountain monograms") on the hills above their locations. Contemporary Australian sculptor Andrew Rogers has created geoglyphs around the world called "The Rhythms of Life". You Yangs Regional Park is the home of a geoglyph constructed by Rogers in recognition of the indigenous people of the area. It depicts Bunjil, a mythical creature in the culture of the local Wautharong Aboriginal people.

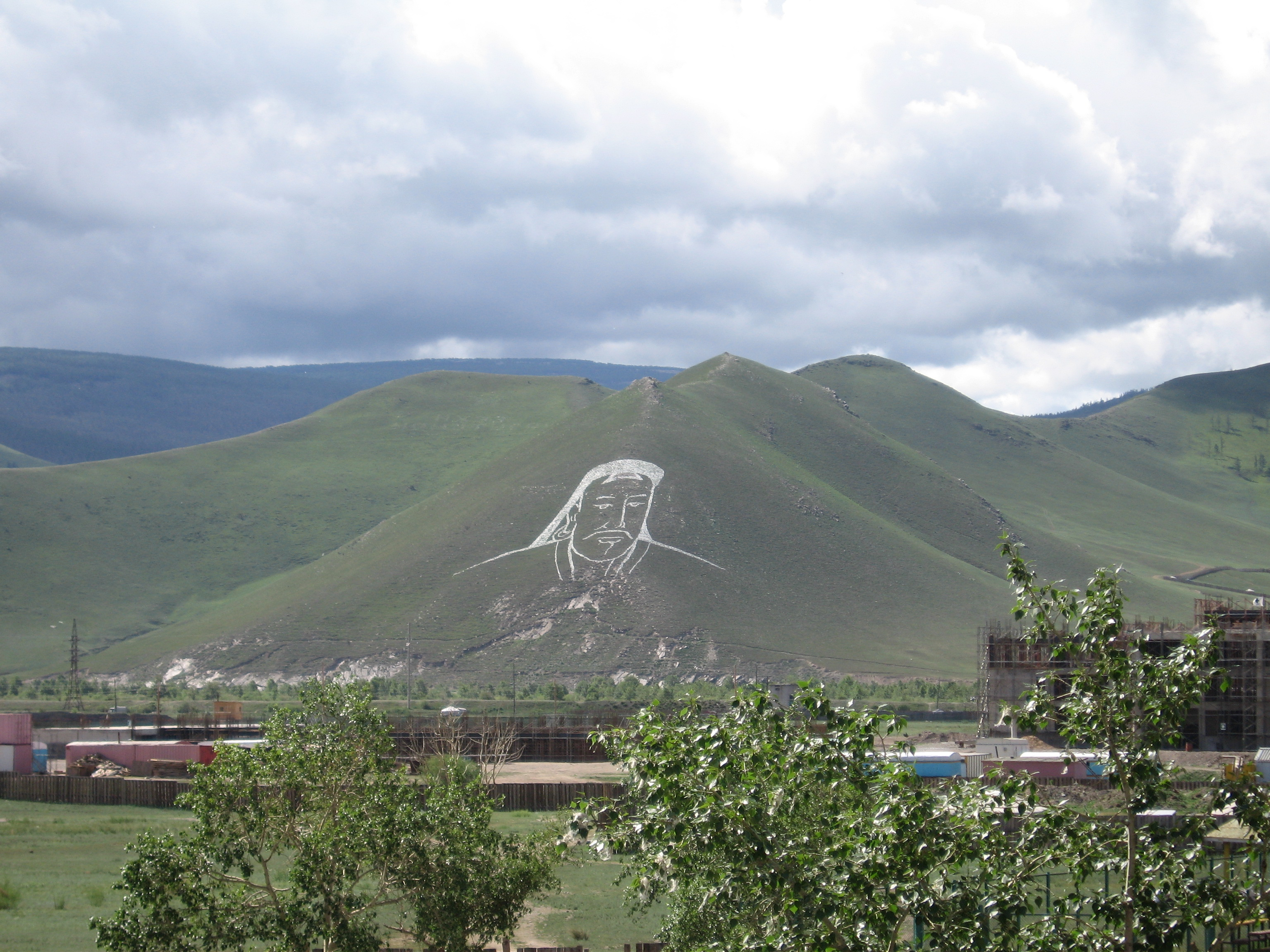
Portrait of Genghis Khan painted onto cleared areas of Mt. Bogd Khan in Mongolia in 2006.

Geoglyphic texts and images are common in Central and Inner Asia but there has been little systematic study of their origins and spread.

More recent figures in the south of England created since the early 1800s have kept up the region's ancient tradition of chalk hillside figures. Examples of these are the Litlington White Horse, Devizes White Horse, Fovant Badges, Cherhill White Horse, and the Marlborough White Horse.

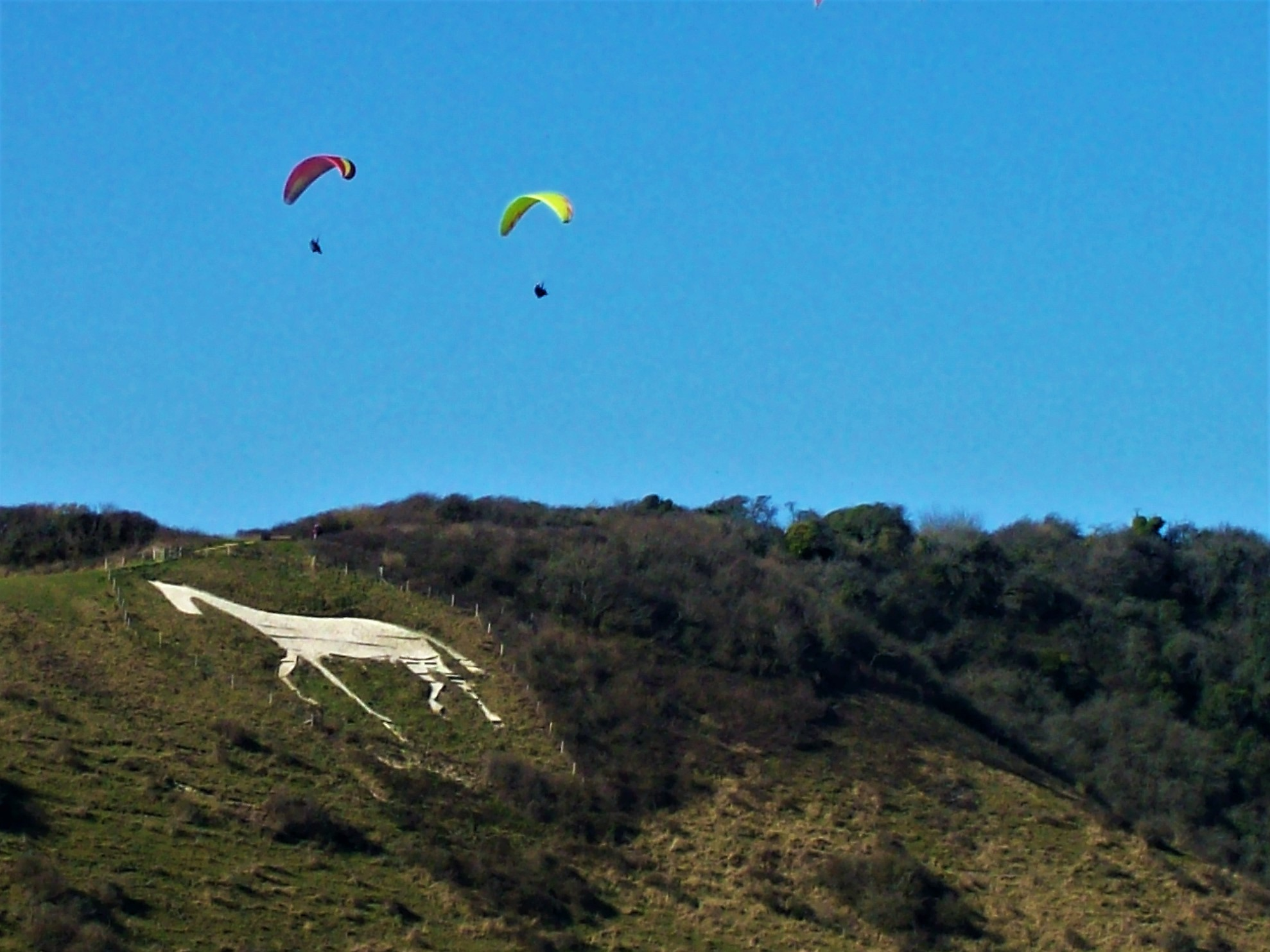
The Litlington White Horse in the village of Litlington, South East England

In 2008–2009 Alfie Dennen created Britglyph, a locative art-focused geoglyph created by having participants across the United Kingdom leave rocks at highly specific locations and uploading media created at each location. When taken together and viewed on the main project website an image of a watch and chain inspired by John Harrison's marine chronometer H5 was created.

People have used the Strava mobile app and other GPS systems to create GPS drawings, virtual geoglyphs.

== Geoglyphs in the world ==
Country	Geoglyph
Australia	Marree Man
Australia	Readymix logo geoglyph
Australia	Bunjil Geoglyph
Bolivia	Sajama Lines
Brazil	Acre geoglyphs
Chile	Atacama Giant
England	Uffington White Horse
England	Westbury White Horse
England	Cerne Abbas Giant
England	Long Man of Wilmington
England	Pewsey White Horse
England	Litlington White Horse
India	Boha geoglyphs
India	Konkan geoglyphs
Israel	Geoglyphs of Har Karkom
North Macedonia	Kanda Geoglyph
Peru	Nazca Lines
Peru	Paracas Candelabra
Russia	Russian geoglyph, in the Ural Mountains
United States	Gila River Valley
United States	Great Serpent Mound
United States	Blythe Intaglios
United States	The Cross (Barre, Massachusetts)

== See also ==
- Petroglyph
- Petrosomatoglyph
- Intaglio (burial mound)
- Battalion Park
- Crop circle
