= The Big Art Project =

- Genre: Documentary
- Narrated by: Bill Nighy
- Country of origin: United Kingdom
- Original language: English
- No. of episodes: 4

Production
- Production locations: Burnley, Cardigan, Isle of Mull, Newham, North Belfast, Sheffield, St. Helens, London
- Production company: Carbon Media

Original release
- Network: Channel 4
- Release: 10 May 2009 – 2009

The Big Art Project (also known as Big Art) is a UK-wide public art initiative funded by the Channel 4 and Arts Council England. The four-part TV series was made by Mike Christie and Mike Smith's company Carbon Media and first broadcast on Sunday 10 May 2009 on Channel 4. Their project also comprises a website centred on The Big Art Mob – designed to create the first comprehensive map of public art across the UK using photographs from people's mobile phones – and significant public art works such as Jaume Plensa's Dream (sculpture) in St Helens, Merseyside. The TV series was narrated by Bill Nighy.

The project was recognised with awards and nominations including an RTS Innovation Award in 2007, the Media Guardian Innovation Award for community engagement in 2008, three nominations for the TV BAFTAs 2008, and a Civic Trust Award 2010
