= BAFTA Interactive Awards =

- Country: United Kingdom
- Presented by: British Academy of Film and Television Arts (BAFTA)
- First award: 2003
- Final award: 2004
- Website: Official website
- Related: BAFTA Interactive Entertainment Awards and BAFTA Games Awards

The BAFTA Interactive Awards and BAFTA Games Awards were created in 2003 by splitting the original BAFTA Interactive Entertainment Awards into two separate ceremonies.

While the previous ceremonies had been annually hosted each October since 1998, the 2003 Interactive Awards weren't held until 19 February of the following year, while the 2004 event took place on 2 March 2005.

In March 2006, BAFTA issued a press release announcing that "Video Games are as Important as Film and Television", and reinstated the Games Awards to the traditional October slot. No mention of Interactive Awards was made, and all traces of the ceremony vanished shortly afterwards when BAFTA's website was reorganised, making it the shortest running event in BAFTA's history.

== Ceremonies ==
Year	Date	Venue	Host	Ref(s)
2003	19 February 2004	London	Unknown	
2004	2 March 2005	Café Royal, London	Unknown	

== Children's Learning ==
2004 : Headline History
2003 : (not awarded)

== Design ==
2004 : Alexander McQueen Website
2003 : Greenwich Millennium Village

== DVD ==
2004 : The Chaplin Collection
2003 : Lion King - Special Edition DVD

== Factual ==
2004 : Stagework
2003 : (two awards - Online & Offline)

== Film/TV website ==
2004 : Trauma
2003 : Starfinder

== Interactive Arts ==
2004 : Frequency and Volume
2003 : Alleph.net

== Interactive Arts Installation ==
2004 : (not awarded)
2003 : The House of Osama Bin Laden

== Interactive TV ==
2004 : Spooks Interactive
2003 : V:MX

== Music ==
2004 : SSEYO miniMIXA
2003 : (not awarded)

== New Talent Award ==
2004 : Dan Jones
2003 : (not awarded)

== News & Sport ==
2004 : England's Exit From Euro 2004
2003 : (not awarded)

== Offline Factual ==
2004 : (single Factual award)
2003 : DNA Interactive DVD

== Offline Learning ==
2004 : (combined with Online Learning)
2003 : Knowledge Box

== Online Entertainment ==
2004 : Hitchhiker's Guide to the Galaxy Adventure Game - 20th Anniversary Edition
2003 : Celebdaq

== Online Factual ==
2004 : (single Factual award)
2003 : Tate Online

== Online Learning ==
2004 : Stagework
2003 : Bodysong

== Technical Innovation ==
2004 : Careers Wales Online
2003 : The Darkhouse
