= BAFTA Interactive Entertainment Awards =

Entertainment awards

- Country: United Kingdom
- Presented by: BAFTA
- First award: 1998
- Final award: 2002
- Website: Official website
- Related: BAFTA Interactive Awards and BAFTA Games Awards

The British Academy of Film and Television Arts (BAFTA) annually hosted the BAFTA Interactive Entertainment Awards for multimedia entertainment between 1998 and 2002. In 2003, BAFTA announced the award would be split into two separate ceremonies – BAFTA Interactive Awards and BAFTA Games Awards – to take place in February the following year.

The 2004 ceremonies were held on 1 and 2 March 2005, after which the Interactive Awards were quietly retired, leaving only the Games Awards to return in October 2006.

== Ceremonies ==
Year	Date	Venue	Host	Ref(s)
1998	29 October	Inter-Continental Hotel, London	Stephen Fry	
1999	20 October	Royal Lancaster Hotel, Hyde Park, London	Rhona Cameron	
2000	26 October	Royal Lancaster Hotel, Hyde Park, London	Phill Jupitus	
2001	25 October	Grosvenor House Hotel, London	Phill Jupitus	
2002	10 October	Grosvenor House Hotel, London	Adam and Joe	

== Accessibility ==
2002 : I-Map (website)
2001 : (not awarded)
2000 : (not awarded)
1999 : (not awarded)
1998 : (not awarded)

== Audio (awarded as 'Sound' pre-2002) ==
2002 : Luigi's Mansion (for GameCube)
2001 : Conker's Bad Fur Day (for Nintendo 64)
2000 : Theme Park World (for Windows)
1999 : Grand Theft Auto: London 1969
1998 : Ceremony of Innocence

== Best UK Developer ==
2002 : (not awarded)
2001 : (not awarded)
2000 : BBC Online
1999 : (not awarded)
1998 : Rare

== Children's ==
2002 : (multiple categories)
2001 : (multiple categories)
2000 : (multiple categories)
1999 : Noddy – Let's Get Ready For School
1998 : Star Wars Droidworks

== Children's Entertainment ==
2002 : Disney's Magic Artist Deluxe (for Windows)
2001 : Disney's Tigger's Honey Hunt (for Windows)
2000 : Lego & Steven Spielberg Moviemaker Set (Multi Format)
1999 : (awarded as single category 'Children's')
1998 : (awarded as single category 'Children's')

== Children's Learning ==
2002 : Frankie's Animal Adventures (for Windows)
2001 : Immaterial Bodies (for Windows)
2000 : Lego & Steven Spielberg Moviemaker Set (Multi Format)
1999 : IJsfontein Masters of the Elements
1998 : (awarded as single category 'Children's')

== Comedy ==
2002 : (not awarded)
2001 : (not awarded)
2000 : (not awarded)
1999 : (not awarded)
1998 : MindGym

== Computer Programming ==
2002 : (not awarded)
2001 : (not awarded)
2000 : (not awarded)
1999 : The Legend of Zelda: Ocarina of Time
1998 : Gran Turismo

== Design ==
2002 : (not awarded)
2001 : (not awarded)
2000 : (not awarded)
1999 : Wip3out
1998 : ShiftControl

== E-Zine ==
2002 : Wellness Heaven Awards
2001 : (not awarded)
2000 : (not awarded)
1999 : The BirdGuides website
1998 : (not awarded)

== Enhancement of Linear Media ==
2002 : Memento (DVD)
2001 : Walking With Beasts (Interactive TV)
2000 : BBC Wimbledon / Golf Sports Coverage (Digital TV)
1999 : (not awarded)
1998 : (not awarded)

== Entertainment Website ==
2002 : (not awarded)
2001 : Tiny Planets (website)
2000 : Cartoon Network UK (website)
1999 : Jamba
1998 : (not awarded)

== Factual ==
2002 : Time Team (website)
2001 : Marconi Online Museum (website)
2000 : BBC History Site (website)
1999 : CNN.com/Coldwar
1998 : Redshift 3

== Games ==
2002 : (multiple categories)
2001 : (multiple categories)
2000 : (multiple categories)
1999 : The Legend of Zelda: Ocarina of Time
1998 : GoldenEye 007

== Games – Console ==
2002 : Halo: Combat Evolved (for Xbox)
2001 : Gran Turismo 3: A-Spec (for PlayStation 2)
2000 : MediEvil II (for PlayStation)
1999 : (awarded as single category 'Games')
1998 : (awarded as single category 'Games')

== Games – Mobile Device ==
2002 : SMS Chess by Purple Software (for mobile phone)
2001 : Tony Hawk's Pro Skater 2 (for Game Boy Advance)
2000 : Pokémon: Yellow Version: Special Pikachu Edition (for Game Boy Color)
1999 : (awarded as single category 'Games')
1998 : (awarded as single category 'Games')

== Games – Multiplayer ==
2002 : Halo: Combat Evolved (for Xbox)
2001 : (not awarded)
2000 : (not awarded)
1999 : (awarded as single category 'Games')
1998 : (awarded as single category 'Games')

== Games – Networked ==
2002 : (not awarded)
2001 : Phantasy Star Online (for Dreamcast)
2000 : (awarded as 'Games – Mobile or Networked)
1999 : (awarded as single category 'Games')
1998 : (awarded as single category 'Games')

== Games – PC ==
2002 : Neverwinter Nights (for Windows)
2001 : Max Payne (for Windows)
2000 : Deus Ex (for Windows)
1999 : (awarded as single category 'Games')
1998 : (awarded as single category 'Games')

== Game – Sports ==
2002 : Geoff Crammond's Grand Prix 4 (for Windows)
2001 : ISS Pro Evolution 2
2000 : Sydney 2000 (for Windows or Dreamcast)
1999 : (awarded as single category 'Games')
1998 : (awarded as single category 'Games')

== Innovative Game ==
2002 : (not awarded)
2001 : (not awarded)
2000 : (not awarded)
1999 : The Legend of Zelda: Ocarina of Time
1998 : (not awarded)

== Interactive Arts ==
2002 : Body Movies
2001 : Sodaplay (website)
2000 : Watched And Measured
1999 : (not awarded)
1998 : (not awarded)

== Interactive TV ==
2002 : MTV Ad-Break Tennis
2001 : (not awarded)
2000 : (not awarded)
1999 : (not awarded)
1998 : (not awarded)

== Interactivity ==
2002 : Pikmin (for GameCube)
2001 : Black and White (for Windows)
2000 : Onlinecaroline.com (website)
1999 : The Legend of Zelda: Ocarina of Time
1998 : Stagestruck (awarded as 'Interactive Treatment')

== Interface Design ==
2002 : Habitat (website)
2001 : Eyes Only (for Windows)
2000 : MTV2 (website)
1999 : (not awarded)
1998 : (not awarded)

== Learning ==
2002 : (multiple categories)
2001 : (multiple categories)
2000 : Immaterial Bodies
1999 : Masters of the Elements
1998 : Lifting the Weight

== Lifestyle And Leisure ==
2002 : (not awarded)
2001 : FreQuency (for PlayStation 2)
2000 : (not awarded)
1999 : (not awarded)
1998 : (not awarded)

== Moving Images ==
2002 : (not awarded)
2001 : Black and White (for Windows)
2000 : Perfect Dark (for Nintendo 64)
1999 : Driver
1998 : Ceremony of Innocence

== Music ==
2002 : (not awarded)
2001 : Shogun Total War: Warlord Edition (for Windows)
2000 : Imperium Galactica II (for Windows)
1999 : (not awarded)
1998 : (not awarded)

== News ==
2002 : (not awarded)
2001 : BBC News Online (website)
2000 : BBC News Online (website)
1999 : BBC News Online (website)
1998 : BBC News Online (website)

== Offline Learning ==
2002 : Antarctic Waves (for Windows)
2001 : (not awarded)
2000 : (not awarded)
1999 : (awarded as single category 'Learning')
1998 : (awarded as single category 'Learning')

== Online Entertainment ==
2002 : Lexus Minority Report Experience (website)
2001 : (not awarded)
2000 : (not awarded)
1999 : (not awarded)
1998 : (not awarded)

== Online Learning ==
2002 : Commanding Heights Online (website)
2001 : Grid Club (website)
2000 : Homework High (website)
1999 : (awarded as single category 'Learning')
1998 : (awarded as single category 'Learning')

== Special awards ==
2002 : Ian Livingstone (BAFTA Interactive Award)
2001 :Championship Manager: Season 00/01 (for Windows) (amazon.co.uk Award)
2000 : David Bowie (Berners-Lee Award)
1999 : Toby Gard & Paul Douglas (Berners-Lee Award)
1998 : Peter Kindersley (Berners-Lee Award)

== Sports & Leisure ==
2002 : The Famous Grouse Experience
2001 : (not awarded)
2000 : (not awarded)
1999 : (not awarded)
1998 : (not awarded)

== Technical Innovation ==
2002 : Tate Multimedia Tours
2001 : SSEYO Koan Interactive Audio Platform
2000 : Sketchaphone (WAP/website)
1999 : (not awarded)
1998 : (not awarded)
