= Masini (surname) =

Masini is an Italian surname. Notable people with the surname include:

- Alfred Masini (1930–2010), American television producer
- Barbara Masini (born 1974), Italian politician
- Donna Masini, American poet and novelist
- Francesco Masini (1894–1964), Maltese lawyer and politician
- Frank Masini (born 1944), Italian-American serial killer
- Galliano Masini (1896–1986), Italian operatic tenor
- Gerardo Masini, (born 1982), Argentine footballer
- Girolamo Masini (1840–1885), Italian sculptor
- Marco Masini (born 1964), Italian singer-songwriter
- Nicola Masini, (born 1965), Italian scientist
- Simone Masini (born 1984) Italian footballer
- Tobia Masini (born 1976), Italian auto racing driver

== See also ==
- Masina (disambiguation)
- Masini (disambiguation)
- Masino
