= Messene (disambiguation) =

Messene is an ancient town in Messenia, Greece.

Messene may also mean:

- Messini, a modern town in Messenia, Greece
- Messina, a city in Sicily named after the ancient town in Messenia, Greece
- Messene (mythology), a mythological character associated with Messenia
- Messene Province, a district including Messini

== See also ==
- Messina (disambiguation), a number of places, people and other objects named after Messina, Sicily
