= Macina =

Macina may refer to:

- Sultanate of Massina, (c. 1400-1818), former state located in present-day Mali
- Macina Empire (1818–1862), successor to the above
- Inner Niger Delta, also known as Macina, the floodplain area in Mali once controlled by the empire
- Macina, town and rural commune in Mali
- Maasina, an old Fulbe term for the Dhar Tichitt region and the origin of the above names
- Front de Libération du Macina
- Macina (musical instrument), a high-pitched string instrument used in Indonesian kroncong music

== See also ==
- Masina (disambiguation)
- Messina (disambiguation)
- Macinaggio, a French village in Corsica
