= Mesina =

Mesina is a surname. Notable people with the surname include:

- Antonia Mesina (1919–1935), Italian murder victim and saint
- Antonio Mesina (born 1993), Italian footballer
- Graziano Mesina (1942–2025), Sardinian bandit
- Ignacio Mesina (born 2001), Chilean footballer

== See also ==
- Messina (disambiguation)
  - Messina, city in Sicily
