= Masina =

Masina may refer to:

Places

- Masina, Kinshasa, in the Democratic Republic of the Congo
- Masina, alternate name of Tabas-e Masina, in Iran
- Masina, Lumbini, in Nepal
- Masina, Rapti, in Nepal
- Masina, Purulia, West Bengal, India
- Masina Empire, alternate spelling of Massina Empire

People

- Adam Masina (1994–), an Italian footballer
- Giulietta Masina (1921–1994), an Italian film actress

== See also ==
- Macina (disambiguation)
- Messina (disambiguation)
