= Giuseppe Orefici =

Italian archaeologist (1946–2025)

Giuseppe Orefici (7 May 1946 – 27 June 2025) was an Italian archaeologist noted for his studies of the Pre-Hispanic civilizations of the Nazca and Rapa Nui cultures.

== Life and career ==
Orefici had a degree in architecture. Beginning in 1982, he was Director of the Nasca Project and has conducted several investigations in Peru, Bolivia, Chile, Mexico, Cuba, and Nicaragua. He directed archaeological excavations in the ceremonial center of Cahuachi (Peru) from 1984, Pueblo Viejo near Nazca (1983–1985), Tiwanaku, Bolivia from 2007 to 2014, and Easter Island (1991–1993, 2001).

He published several books and articles on Nasca and Rapa Nui cultures and curated numerous exhibitions on pre-Hispanic culture in the Americas and in Europe. The most important research, which continues, is the archaeological excavation and conservation of Cahuachi.

Orefici died on 27 June 2025, at the age of 79.

== Later research ==
Orefici was Director of Centro de Estudios Arqueológicos Precolombinos, es:Museo Arqueológico Antonini in Nazca, Peru and the Nasca Project. He concentrated on the study of Nasca and Tiwanaku civilizations, with particular reference to architecture, and pre-Hispanic petroglyphs.

== Scientific publications ==
- Ligabue G., Orefici G., Rapa Nui, Erizzo, 1994.
- Orefici G., Nasca: arte e società del popolo dei geoglifi, Jaca Book, Milano, 1993.
- Orefici G., Cahuachi. Capital Teocratica Nasca. Lima: Universidad San Martín de Porres, 2012.
- Orefici G., Mensajes de nuestros antepasados: petroglifos de Nasca y Palpa, Apus Graph Ediciones, Lima, 2013
- Lasaponara R., Masini N., Orefici G. (Eds). The Ancient Nasca World: New Insights from Science and Archaeology. Springer International Publishing, 2016
- Orefici G., Cultura alimentaria de los antiguos Nasca. Significado sagrado y profano de sus tradiciones culinarias. Lima. Universidad San Martín de Porres. 2019.

== Bibliography ==
- Aimi A., Arqueólogos Intelectuales Italianos en el Peru. Instituto Italiano de Cultura de Lima, Lima, 2015, pp. 46–47.
