= Masini =

Masini may refer to:

- Masini (surname)
- Masini, Iran

== See also ==
- Massini
