= Chauchilla Cemetery =

Archaeological site in Peru

Coordinates: 14.9833°S 74.9263°W

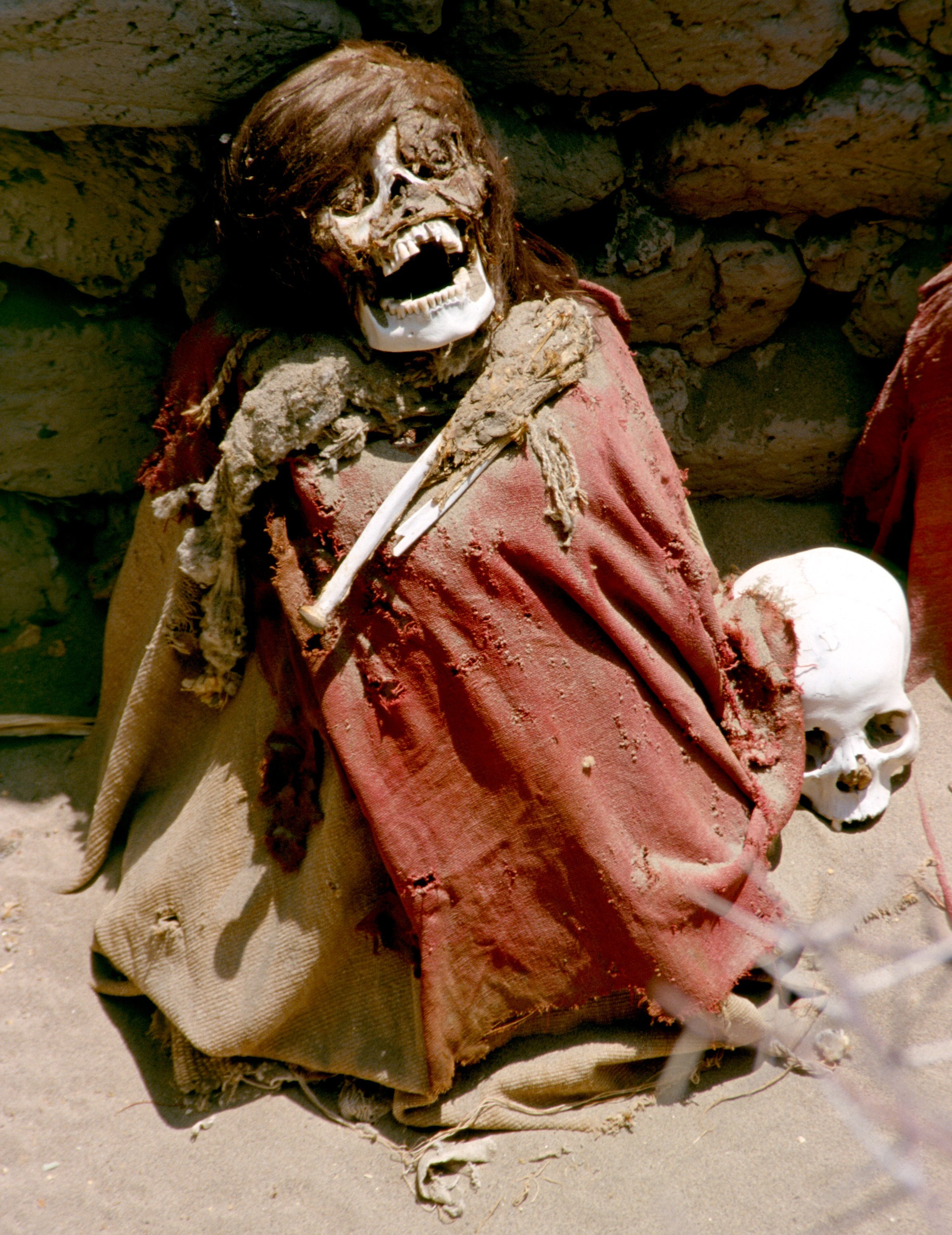
- Mummy in the Cemetery of Chauchilla
- Interactive map of Chauchilla Cemetery

Details
- Established: c. 200 AD
- Location: Chauchilla, Nazca
- Country: Peru

Chauchilla Cemetery is a cemetery that contains prehispanic mummified human remains and archeological artifacts, located 30 kilometres (19 mi) south of the city of Nazca in Peru.

The cemetery is associated with the Nazca culture. The interments started c. 200 AD and continued until the 9th century. The forgotten cemetery was discovered in the 1920s. It had been plundered by grave robbers, but the remaining bodies have been preserved. A resin used in the funeral rites is thought to have protected the bodies from insects and bacteria.

== History ==
The cemetery was discovered in the 1920s, but had not been used since the 9th century AD. The cemetery includes many important burials over a period of 600 to 700 years. The start of the interments was in about 200 AD. It is important as a source of archaeology to the Nazca culture.

The cemetery has been extensively plundered by huaqueros (grave robbers) who have left human bones and pottery scattered around the area. Similar local cemeteries have been damaged to a greater extent. The site has been protected by Peruvian law since 1997 and tourists pay 8 soles (PEN) to take the two-hour tour of this ancient necropolis. The site is by the Poroma riverbed and can be accessed via a dirt road from the Panamerican Highway. In 1997, the majority of the scattered bones and plundered pottery were restored to the tombs.

== Preservation of the bodies ==
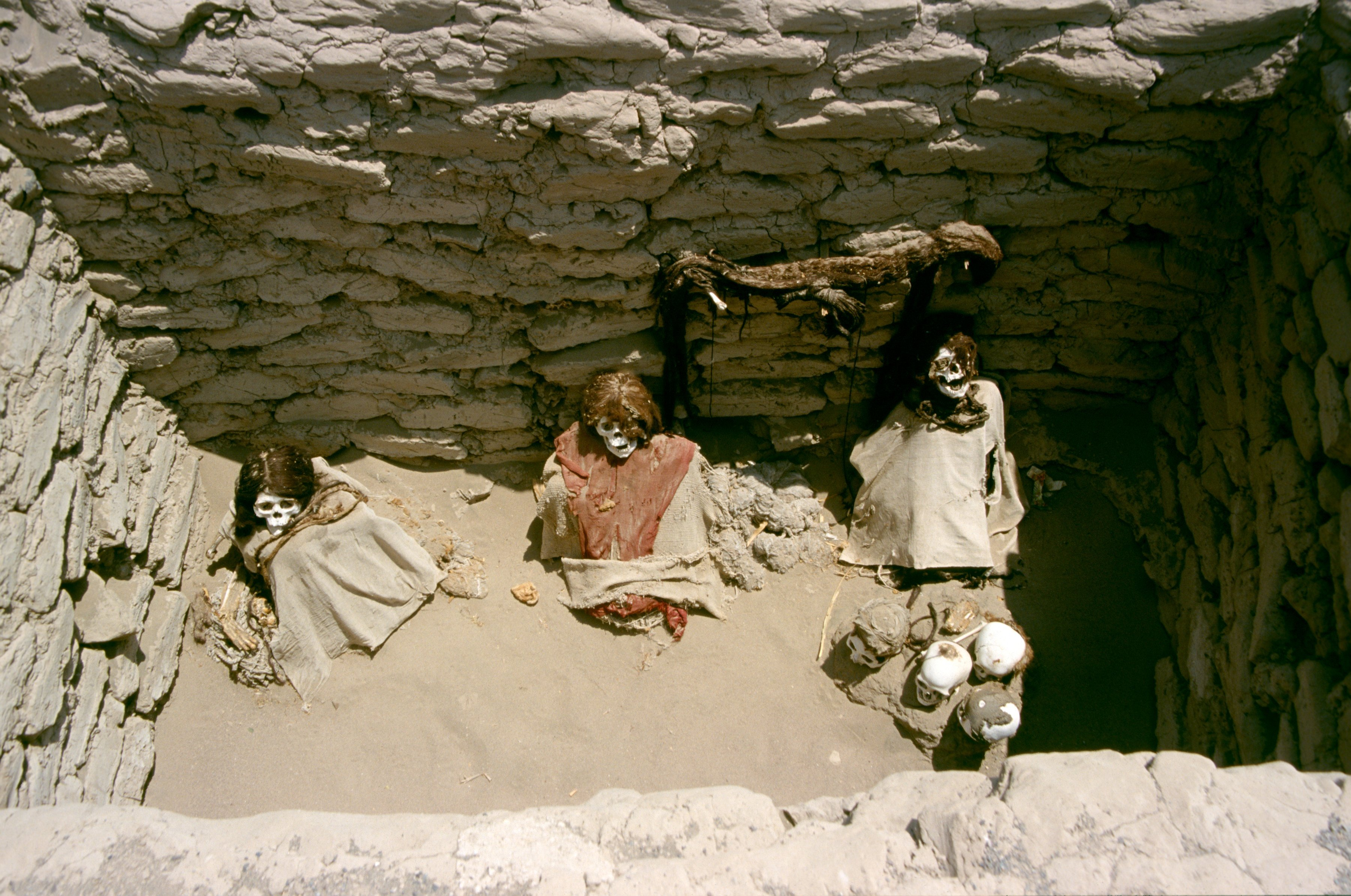
The tombs were built for family groups

The bodies are so remarkably preserved due mainly to the dry climate in the Peruvian Desert but the funeral rites were also a contributing factor. The bodies were clothed in embroidered cotton and then painted with a resin and kept in purpose-built tombs made from mud bricks. The resin is thought to have kept out insects and slowed bacteria trying to feed on the bodies.

The nearby site of Estaquería may provide clues to the remarkable preservation of the numerous bodies in these cemeteries. At that site, archeologists found wooden pillars initially thought to have been used for astronomical sightings. However, it is now believed that the posts were used to dry bodies in a mummification process. This may account for the high degree of preservation seen in thousand-year-old bodies which still have hair and the remains of soft tissue, such as skin.

== In popular culture ==
Chauchilla Cemetery is a prominent setting in Indiana Jones and the Kingdom of the Crystal Skull. Though not called by name in the film, the cemetery is explicitly identified in the screenplay, promotional materials, and merchandise.

This fictionalized version of the cemetery features a number of embellishments, including mask-wearing Nazcan guards and a hidden, underground burial chamber accessible through the barrows. The cemetery is depicted as being built on a promontory overlooking the Nazca Valley, offering the characters a view of the famous Nazca Lines.

== See also ==
- Nazca culture
