= Cahuachi =

Archaeological site in Peru

Coordinates: 14°49′7″S 75°7′0″W

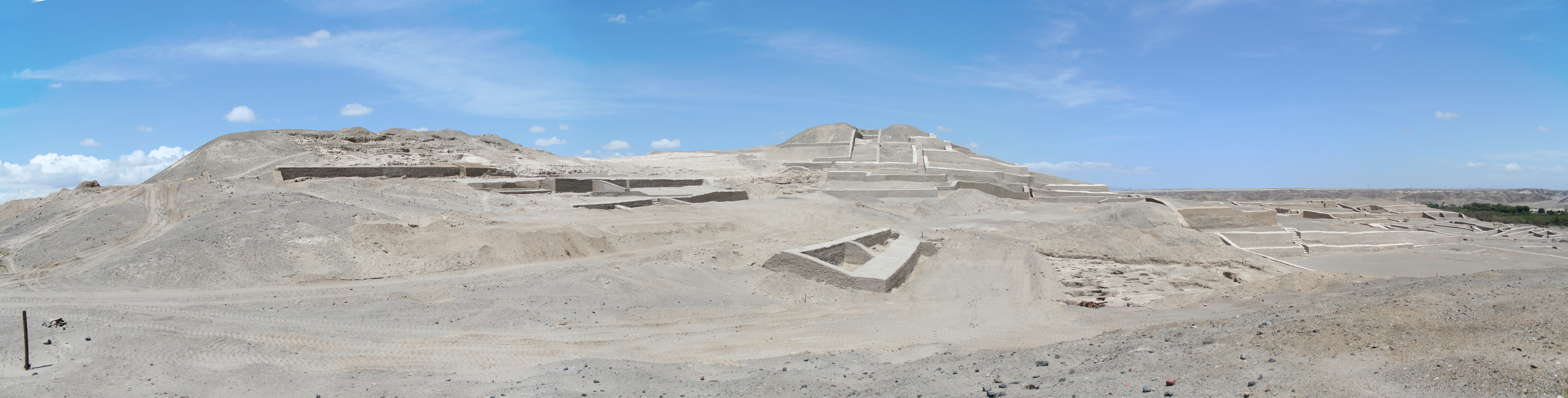
Adobe pyramids at Cahuachi

Cahuachi, in Peru, was a major ceremonial center of the Nazca culture, based from about 1–500 CE in the coastal area of Peru's central Andes. It overlooked some of the Nazca lines. The Italian archaeologist Giuseppe Orefici excavated at the site for the past few decades. The site contains over 40 mounds topped with adobe structures. The huge architectural complex covers 0.6 sq. miles (1.5 km²) at 365 meters above sea level. The American archeologist Helaine Silverman has also conducted long term, multi-stage research and written about the full context of Nazca society at Cahuachi, published in a lengthy study in 1993.

Scholars once thought the site was the capital of the Nazca state but have determined that the permanent population was quite small. They believe that it was a pilgrimage center, whose population increased greatly preceding and during major ceremonial events. New research has suggested that 40 of the mounds were natural hills modified to appear as artificial constructions. Support for the pilgrimage theory comes from archaeological evidence of sparse population at Cahuachi, the spatial patterning of the site, and ethnographic evidence from the Virgin of Yauca pilgrimage in the nearby Ica Valley.

Looting is the greatest problem facing the site today. Most of the burial sites surrounding Cahuachi were not known until recently and are tempting targets for looters.

== Geographic and environmental overview ==
The Cahuachi site is located near the south coast of Peru, and found in the Nazca Valley. Within the Nazca Valley is the Río Grande de Nazca drainage system and is where the Nazca culture developed. The area is ecologically classified as “pre-mountain desert formation.” There is a very important ecological transition going on within the Río Grande de Nazca drainage system, transitioning from pre-mountain desert zone of the coast, to chuapiyunga (meaning "between hot and cold") up towards the highlands, and east of the town Nazca the transition to true yunga begins. Yunga refers to the Quechua Yungas meaning "warm valley". The site itself can be found on the southern side of the Nazca River, one of ten major tributaries that form the Río Grande de Nazca drainage system. The greater Nazca Valley drainage area is very dry in the summer and extremely hot. Precipitation varies between none and 125 mm; daytime summer temperatures average 21.3 °C.

To the north and south Cahuachi faces two pampas, or flat plain-like terrain: Pampa de San José and Pampa de Atarco, and on these plains is where the famous ground-drawings of the Nazca desert are found. The Río Grande region's soils are available for irrigation agriculture with limitations. Cahuachi is located off of the valley bottom of the treeless hills and terraces beneath Pampa de Atarco, and has been known to be subject to strong winds that are capable of becoming sandstorms. It is on these treeless hills that formed the core majority of artificial constructions at Cahuachi. There is, also present, sporadic rains and cyclical floods which result in water erosion of the terrain, which made some parts of the valley uninhabitable, which influenced the settlement pattern of Cahuachi.

Cahuachi lies over brown barren river terraces that are characterized by hills, above the bottom of the valley. Hills were modified in various ways to create civic or ceremonial centers.

== History of research at Cahuachi ==
Frabee was the first to actually acknowledge and excavate the site of Cahuachi in the Nazca region in 1922. The following researchers have also studied and interpreted the site: Kroeber (1926), Tello (1927), Doering (1932), Strong (1952–1953), Robinson (1954–1955).

Among the most extensive research done at Cahuachi was the excavations conducted by archaeologist William Strong. Strong was one of the only archaeologists who took a broad approach to the site, contextualizing it within Nasca society and south coast prehistory. He set out to find stratigraphic evidence that would resolve the gap between Paracas and Nasca styles in the region. He also did settlement pattern studies in order to find out the kinds of activities that went on at Cahuachi. William Duncan Strong's excavations in the early Nasca site of Cahuachi from 1952–1953 found that the site was composed of temples, cemeteries, and house mounds. Following his findings, other scholars within Peruvian archaeology interpreted the site to have been an urban settlement with residential structures. However, more recent excavations and experiments suggests this to be unlikely.

In the early 1980s, American archaeologist Helaine Silverman and Italian architect Giuseppe Orefici conducted intensive and extensive archaeological excavations in several areas of the site. This new research was aimed towards finding and clarifying the real character of the site and of Nasca society. Orefici's excavations in 1983 had revealed the evidence ceramic production in the form of an oven; however he has recovered various burial sites, ceremonial drums, and pottery which suggests that the site is indeed a ceremonial center.

Cahuachi is where Helaine Silverman began her dissertation fieldwork on early Nasca society in 1983. She later inferred from her data and analysis how Cahuachi would have functioned as a ceremonial center and its role in state formation and urbanism, within a regional and pan-Andean scope. Silverman's data from the excavations and experiments in 1986, strongly support the claim that the site was indeed a ceremonial centre. Through her work and research, Silverman found no evidence of inhabitants or domestic and residential structures indicating it to be an urban settlement. She suggested that the site was used as a ceremonial center where people periodically performed religious activities. By examining the remains of pottery, Silverman also suggested that pottery was taken and was broken at the site as a part of the activities and rituals taking place at that time. The vegetal and faunal remains also indicated that food was brought to the site and immediately consumed there. Later research also indicated the consumption of hallucinogenic beverages at the site.

Excavations and surveys conducted by Giuseppe Orefici indicate that the site was not a permanent domestic habitat. The site contains around 40 archaeological mounds and progressive excavations of the area found that most of these mounds were not used for habitation, but that it was more likely a religious ceremonial setting.

== Chronology and Nasca style pottery ==
There is a major emphasis on Nasca style pottery at Cahuachi. Recognized as a discrete style first by Adolf Bastian, Nasca style is a polychrome pottery and is generally noted as having a “south coast” provenance and is named Nasca for its focal regional distribution in the Nasca valley. There are two principal modalities in the decorative style of Nasca pottery: “Monumental” and “proliferous” (coined terms by Rowe).

Monumental refers to the types of Nasca pottery with so-called realistic designs, while Proliferous describes more “conventionalized motifs” with volutes, rays, and points. Gayton and Kroeber established three categorizable characteristics-shape, color, and design- and based on the relationships between these attributes came up with four chronological phases or “substyles” of Nasca pottery:

Nasca pottery classifications
Gayton & Kroeber		Dawson	Rowe
(A)	the earliest	1–4	“Monumental”
(X)	transitional	5	“Proliferous”
(Y)	miscellaneous, or otherwise unable to be assigned a phase	6, 7	
(B)	latest	8, 9	

Later, came the Dawson seriation which subdivided the Nasca style into nine phases. These are then associated into certain periods and epochs. Monumental includes Nasca 1–4 and Gayton and Kroeber's Nazca A, while Proliferous encompasses the innovation of Nasca 5; and Nasca 6 and 7 pottery and corresponds to Gayton and Kroeber's Nazca Y.

Because of the frequency of Nasca 3 pottery and its association with architecture at the site, the conclusion is that Cahuachi is early Intermediate Period of the Ica (south coast ceramic periods). Nasca 1 and 2 are represented at a lesser degree, but are still significantly present as well. One of Strong's goals in his research at Cahuachi was "to resolve the temporal relationship between Paracas and Nasca" style pottery, which was still stratigraphically unproven. Stong's conclusions were that the ceremonial structures at Cahuachi date to the "middle Nazca culture phase" (Nazca 3), and not late Nazca. Instead, late Nazca dates were only found to be associated with graves. According to Silverman (1993), p. 54, all later scholars are in basic agreement with Strong.

== Agriculture and economy ==
Cahuachi is considered a non-urban ceremonial center, meaning that it was never densely occupied and people did not actually live there long-term, this is evidenced by perishable and temporary “wattle and daub-like” structures (not unlike the ones made today) excavated on site. It was more of a pilgrimage or religious destination. So, although for the extensive evidence of Nasca pottery that is used to date the site, and considering the massive specialized culture that goes with it, the evidence for craft specialization and intensive trade and agriculture is understandably limited than if the site were a permanent residence of a large population.

=== Agriculture – edible food materials present ===
At least 15 species of shellfish remains were found at Cahuachi, as well as one type of echinoderm, and four types of fish. Interesting to note as well, is that the most abundant types of botanical remains found at Cahuachi were also most easily transported such as peanut, and were also locally and seasonally available like the huarango fruit native to the area, and more importantly, Cahuachi. The reason for why there is a limited amount of edible plant remains found here is because Cahuachi was not a permanently inhabited place, so any food that was brought there was kept in small storage and quickly consumed. Other edible foods found at Cahuchi include potato, sweet potato, manioc, beans, squash, and achira. Excavations at the unit 16 wall revealed loose earth and some windblown organic remains found within postholes that had been excavated down to sterile soil. Materials recovered include: Huarango seed, pacae leaf, guayaba seed, and llama excrement. Another excavation at the unit 16 wall of five circular and roughly circular depressions contained, among other things, guinea pig hair, and gourd fragments.

A special food preparation area evidenced by the presence of a corn popper and the ritual importance of corn in the Andes was also found at Cahuachi. Small storage facilities and vessels that would have contained food and drink only sufficient for short visits to the ceremonial center both support the fact that Cahuachi was not permanently inhabited at all times and therefore most likely did not have intensive agriculture at the site itself. That being said, all these remains had to come from somewhere, and so they can be used as evidence that indicates the types of food most popular and abundant in this area at the time. The presence of the food materials and the absence of most of their cultivation within the site of Cahuachi can also be indicative of trade networks within the surrounding communities.

=== Agriculture – ritual food materials present ===
Among ritual or ceremonial remains recovered through Strong's excavations at Cahuachi in unit 2, also known as The Great Temple, were llama remains, bird plumage, as well as other things like fine pottery and panpipes, which he also interpreted as feasting and sacrificial materials. Strong's 1957 excavations of a multitude of llama remains on the Great Temple, as well as some rare guinea pig remains at the excavation of Unit 19 are a small indication of the types of animals available in this area. At least 23 guinea pig remains, used as sacrificial offerings, were recovered. All had their heads jerked out of articulation and pristine preservation of their soft tissues allowed Silverman to determine that their undersides had been split open from the neck down, resembling modern-day divination rituals.

Caches of maize, huarango pods, as well as a small concentration of shell were all found at Cahuachi, and are, again, considered to have ritual purposes rather than agricultural significance. At one of the more well-known constructions at Cahuachi is the Room of the Posts. Here, in front of a deep niche, were two cylindrical depressions, resembling postholes, and within them were found ten unworked pieces of Spondylus, a shell sacred in the Andean region. Within a round depression excavated in the room they found a cache of huarango pods. 16 whole pots and hundreds of sherds-all dating to Nasca 8 style- were also found in the room, along with a cache of blue-painted ají peppers, four portable looms, pyroengraved gourd rattles, and plain gourd containers. All were deposited as offerings, which makes sense since this is a ceremonial center. The abundance of the huarango fruit seeds and pods as the site, in both consumable and ritual use, is because it could be grown within the Cahuachi region and therefore was most at hand and used in everyday life, making it life sustaining as well as ritually significant.

All the evidence within this category are relating to ritual and sacrificial purposes rather than direct agricultural practices at Cahuachi. Considering that this was a non-urban center, it seems safe to assume there was no intensive agriculture going on at Cahuachi, and rather any domesticated resource evidence found was brought to Cahuachi from the outside, like nearby cities or towns, and could quite possibly fall more under the category of trade rather than agriculture.

=== Economy – trade ===
Because Cahuachi was a non-urban ceremonial center there was not a permanent population living long-term within the site. This means that the people who did spend time there, were not there long enough to do things like set up an intensive agricultural system, or contribute to large-scale craft specialization and production. That is not to say that they did not do any of these things, but just not on as large of a scale as an actual city would. Cahuachi was, however, a ceremonial center and more importantly a religious destination, so there were people going to and from the site on a regular basis, developing a sort of "pilgrimage trade" system. Most things, like pottery, food, animals, and other transportable items were brought to Cahuachi by individuals.

Among ritual or ceremonial remains recovered through Strong's excavations at Cahuachi in unit 2 were things like fine pottery and panpipes. Not all Nasca pottery was produced at Cahuachi. It is much more likely, especially for the fancy pottery, that it was produced in nearby regional centers where this type of craft specialization was prominent, and then brought to and used at Cahuachi, indicative of trade goings on at Cahuachi rather than craft production.

== Economy: Craft specialization and production ==
=== Economy – textiles ===
Cahuachi's role as a ceremonial center has left a major amount of its society's material expression of their cosmological beliefs; displaying their beliefs through such material items as textiles, ceramics, and decoration or iconography on these items. In Silverman's excavations, many loose threads, unattached three-dimensional embroideries, spun and unspun fiber, and several spindle whorls were all found. Strong also claims to have had found fancy textile remains, possibly used in Nasca funerary shrouds or elite / priestly attire, which would all make sense to the ceremonial center claim at Cahuachi. There is also evidence of the presence of craft quarters in the plaza at Cahuachi. Silverman believes that Cahuachi was “a locus of textile production where the shrouds of those special individuals buried at the site and the elaborate costumes worn by Nasca priests and/or ritual performers were produced.”

The "Great Cloth" The world largest known textile was found entombed in Cahuachi, the Nasca ceremonial and political center in 1952 during excavation led by William Duncan Strong. Unfortunately the excavation method damaged the cloth and now it's in four pieces in the collection of the Department of Anthropology at Columbia University. The weft selvage was measured as over 5.5 m, but its original length, only estimated during the excavation, would have been at least 50–60 m. The making of this plain weave cloth would have required an estimated 9 million feet of cotton yarn, which certainly involved highly organized labor force. The careful entombment of the Great Cloth at the largest plaza in an otherwise refuse free, sterile area shows the ritual importance of this textile.

=== Economy – pottery ===
Ceramic analysis at Cahuachi supports Silverman's assertion that Cahuachi was a non-urban ceremonial center because there is a predominance of fine ware rather than plain ware at the site, on the rate of 70% to 30%, which, if you think about it, would be unquestionably reversed if Cahuachi were a permanently inhabited urban area. The majority of plain ware that was found at the site were mainly those used for small-scale storage and burials, then those used for food service.

Fine ware, of ritual significance, was decorated and was used for burials and also included technologically complex panpipes, which is a form of craft specialization. Family-sized cooking pots are rare at the site. Not all Nasca pottery was produced at Cahuachi. It is much more likely, especially for the fine pottery, that it was produced in nearby regional centers where this type of craft specialization was prominent, and then brought to and used at Cahuachi. Again this fact is more indicative of trade goings on at Cahuachi rather than large scale craft production at the site.

== Architecture and artifacts ==
Cahuachi's architecture and its organization are characteristic of a ceremonial center, and is not urban. At Cahuachi, there are mound and room constructions, a structure called the “Great Temple”, walls that form corridors and passageways, as well as major walls, circular depressions, cylindrical shafts on top of mounds, and kanchas. Kanchas are the bounded open spaces beneath and between mounds and can be defined as a walled field or patio area that does not necessarily insinuate any specific function. The following analyses are largely based on Strong's excavations and Silverman's survey and reanalysis of the site.

There are about 40 mounds at Cahuachi. Some mounds had rooms on top of them, others did not, some are considered to be “temples,” and still others were used for burials. But furthermore, the majority of the mounds at Cahuachi are overwhelmingly never actual “habitation mounds”. Strong originally classified these mounds as “habitation mounds” but Silverman argues that they are not domestic, which is in keeping with her assertion that Cahuachi was a non-urban ceremonial center. For some examples of the types of mounds at Cahuachi Silverman focuses on cuts and survey of units 5, 6, and 7. The core of unit 5 is a natural hill that was artificially raised through construction and fills. The fill contained bundles and intertwined vegetal fibers, earth, rock, and garbage. The mound has a lot more fill than other mounds because it was artificially raised by placing alternating layers of these vegetal fills. Unit 5 also had several circular depressions, or “cache pits” according to Strong, and only a few contained small amounts of corn cobs and beans. The walls were made of adobe with a sand foundation, and is a construction technique interspersed throughout Cahuachi.

Then more fill was placed behind the wall and in front of the hill. This fill consisted of vegetal fiber, lumps of adobe, sand, a few sherds that prove that the construction of the mound cannot predate Nasca 3 period. Another interesting addition to the fills contents were the presence of offerings like a cache of maize, a large plainware, oxidized olla. The fact that these offerings were made alludes to a ceremonial function of the unit. At unit 6 Strong originally classified the construction as a Middle Nasca temple that was built over a late Paracas domestic dwelling, but the association of the circular pits also dug there with Paracas 10 – Nasca pottery and the dwellings should not necessarily be classified as late Paracas. Here, also, there are adobe walls used to retain fill at this unit, just like at unit 5. There was a wattle and daub wall found underneath, and is a previous occupation of the area that was of a domestic nature, but by occupation stage 3 (after the wattle and daub occupation) the construction of the actual mound was for a non-habitation purpose, and this is evidenced by the lack of habitation structure refuse.

Unit 7 was also originally classified by Strong as a residential space, but Silverman points out that there is an extraordinary amount of decorated pottery and special artifacts, such as an obsidian knife, embroidered fringed borders, a comb of cactus spines and cane, and a fine engraved gourd, and at best was perhaps the living space for priests.

Cahuachi's layout largely depends on already existing topographical features, but it can also be said that it has a "mound-kancha" pattern. It is so named because there is much open, or rather empty, space at Cahuachi. Instead of bunches of construction taking up a space, the mounds at Cahuachi would be better described as islands. Because of the commitment to executing construction around and in convenience to the natural geography, it can be inferred that this may reflect social spatial organization for the site, which is interpretively unrestricted. It is easily accessible from virtually any direction, with no walls, or moats, or anything blocking entrance into the site.

Terracing hills was also a common practice at Cahuachi because it was "energetically and materially cheap" and still produced the appearance of monumental architecture, like large ceremonial mounds or temples. One of the more well-known mounds at Cahuachi came to be called by Strong the “Great Temple”. It is debatable whether or not that this construction is the one and only “Great Temple” at Cahuachi, but it truly did have a ceremonial purpose which is obvious by the large amounts of Nasca 3 pottery, panpipe fragments, llama remains, bird plumage, and other offertory materials recovered.

Rooms are not found on all mounds. For the rooms that do exist, the walls of are built of adobe. There are a few different types of adobe clay present at the site, and are sometime mixed together in the construction of walls and rooms. The types of adobe include: Beige, yellow, or grey. All of the rooms also had a final layer of mud. There are very few walls that had been painted. The walls were usually not very high (not exceeding one meter) and were very thick. The use of huarango posts in the construction of rooms and walls is also common at Cahuachi.

The major walls at Cahuachi were carefully constructed and well made. The layers of adobe used to build them are carefully regular, and had two final layers of mud plaster, as well as a white wash finish.

The Room of the Posts is said to have some sort of ancestor worship association because of the use of huarango posts. In this region, huarango is sometimes used to symbolize ancestry, sort of like the biblical tree of life. These “ancestor posts” are further supported by the structures apparent use as a burial place, and a special carved huarango post that depicts a human face and flute. Another interesting aspect to consider and is supportive of an ancestral interpretation is that the radiocarbon dates on some of the posts are earlier than Strong's Nasca 5 dates of the area, which can be explained because perhaps they were not erected at the same time, but at important, symbolic life events, or that since they hold special significance that they were reused from an earlier structure. In one of the walls of the room there is a niche and two small depressions within that, containing spondylus shell.

In addition to the already above mentioned artifacts, there were many plainware and decorated vessels including vases, bowls, bottles with handles, caches, musical instruments, and baskets. Strong dated many of these items to Nasca 5 times. There was also found in the Room of the Posts "four bundles of tied canes conforming to back-strap looms". This versatility could perhaps be due to the fact that people carried all their belongings that they would need for their stay at Cahuachi. Fineware and plainware at Cahuachi was studied by Helaine Silverman where she studied types of vessel shape, painted design and color, and their relative dates and chronology. There are twenty five shape classes described by Gayton and Kroeber. Common vessel shapes at Cahuachi were the "double-spout-and bridge- bottles". The Nasca phase of this class of pottery distributed at Cahuachi is largely phase 3 or undeterminable.

Another notable vessel class is Nasca 1 blackware bowls, early Nasca bowls, dishes, basket vessels, modeled vessels, neckless ollas, and necked ollas. According to Strong's conclusions, Cahuachi's main occupation was during Nasca 3. There was another major earlier Nasca occupation, corresponding to early Nasca 1 and 2, but was not the main occupation of Cahuachi.

== Nasca cult society and Cahuachi ==
Although Cahuachi held a significant position in the communities of Nasca 3 times, it was specifically a ceremonial center and did not have a large residential population, and therefore did not necessarily have a hierarchy of power or leadership like one that would be found at a complex habitational site. The varying sizes of mounds at the site do, however, provide a basis for distinguishing the social groups that created them. Mounds all over the Nasca drainage system were created by the local social groups in the region, and, as one would assume, the larger groups were the ones who built and maintained the largest temple mounds, while the lesser mounds were built by much smaller groups.

The amount of monumental architecture at Cahuachi, however, cannot be explained except for Helaine Silverman's interpretation that Cahuachi held a sacred geography that made it the focus of the Nasca cult, which includes any political aspects that come along with this, such as monumental architecture being symbols of group unity and shared ancestry, while at the same time sending a widespread political message to allies or rivals. Cahuachi, as a religious pilgrimage destination, also leads to the assumption of community-wide participation and cooperation. Furthermore, Cahuachi's obvious influence and importance in Nasca society and the fact that it was primarily a ceremonial center suggests that political power and social differences may not have been exclusively based on the economy. This is further evidenced by a lack of clear mortuary differentiation in early Nasca society and iconographic portrayals of elites, which lead researchers to believe that there could have been at least a group-oriented chiefdom where accumulation of personal wealth was forgone or otherwise unachievable.

The main thing that connected the segments of peoples in the Rio Grande de Nazca drainage system were their Nasca cultural traditions and religious cult where Cahuachi was the center, but only as a temporary pilgrimage site, and otherwise they lived in their own smaller communities with their own separate local ceremonial and domestic foci, and was therefore not politically centralized. Nasca society in terms of its location in the Rio Grande de Nazca drainage system also played its part in their sociopolitics. By observing and even literally mapping out the filtration gallery system – which determined settlement patterns as well – provided exclusive knowledge to those that were discerning of it, able to manipulate that knowledge, and therefore allowing for significant positions of power or control. These individuals were most likely 'priests' or 'shamans'.

== Religion and ideology ==
Cahuachi's primary application as a ceremonial center actually still leaves a lot to be discovered about the specifics of its religion and ideology. Cahuachi itself has mainly temples of varying sizes as its main architecture, where various religious practices and rituals took place, and was also used as a place to bury the dead and is surrounded by cemeteries. Cahuachi was obviously geographically sacred to the Nasca 3 people, it is just that it is unknown exactly why that is. Some things can be inferred upon, however, as in the case of the Room of the Posts, one of the most well-known constructions at Cahuachi. The room is characterized by well-made adobe walls that even happened to be painted with images pertaining to ceremonial uses such as Nasca panpipes, and rayed faces. The fact that the walls were painted at all is significant in itself because, except for the endless amount of painted pottery at the site, there is not much for examples of other mediums of painting there. The Room of the Posts contained niches and circular depressions filled with offertory goods like caches and pottery filled with corn, spondylus shells, or huarango pods, as well as such items as blue-painted ají peppers, gourd rattles, portable looms, and painted fineware.

Finally, inside the room there are huarango positioned upright all over the room. Some are aligned in certain directions, all of different heights, one group has three rows of three all standing together near the western wall, one is even carved into a face playing a flute. Besides the architectural features, there is not much to learn just from the presence of the posts, but the cultural features associated with the huarango plant in the Río Grande de Nazca region is significant. The huarango plant is a shrubby legume native to and grown in this region; it has symbolic ancestral meaning associated with the tree of life and a person's spiritual roots, still held to this day. By looking at cultural beliefs in the region today, some interpreters have inferred that the room had ancestral and genealogical significance. As far as altars go, in the center of the room is a very low, square clay platform, in the middle of which is a round depression. Textile production was one of the few craft specializations that went on at Cahuachi on a regular basis. These fancy textile remains were most likely used as Nasca funerary shrouds or for presumably elite or priestly attire.

Highly stylized painted pottery was found throughout Cahuachi, and had the most religious significance when found in association with burials and offertory remains inside of them. Other remains that held religious purposes at Cahuachi were animal remains. Llama remains, bird plumage used as decoration for headdresses or the like, and guinea pig remains with broken necks and evidence of being sacrificed with their undersides slit open, were evidence of sacrificial rituals that are reminiscent of divination practices, still practiced by some today. Besides the altar in the Room of the Posts as described above, there were circular depressions and niches in the floors and walls of many of the other structures built. All of them contain or contained offertory items, mainly containers or caches of maize, spondylus shell, huarango pods, and blue-painted ají peppers. Other subsurface storage jars found without food in them can be used as evidence of communal feasting. There is little to no evidence of a prominent use of writing at Cahuachi.

There is some very specific iconography going on there, though, that portray masked ritual performers or priests, mythical beings, and ceremonial rites that honor agricultural fertility, as well as going so far as to confirm that farmers even participated in these celebrations as well. Finally, trophy head taking was an important aspect of the Nasca cult, which are displayed on early Nasca pottery where costumed figures hold decapitated human heads.

Pertaining to the elite and the “power” structure of Cahuachi, it was important because it was the main center for people all over the region to come together. Priests could definitely be considered elite because they more than likely got to spend the majority to spend most of their time there, and were therefore able to, as well as had special clothing that was probably manufactured and designed on site, as well as had privileged access to “temples” and rites in which they perform their sacred duties. Religion, as previously discussed, is unanimously a huge part of Nasca culture just from the very fact that Cahuachi exists, and the leaders of this place must have been influential in Cahuachi at the least. However, also previously discussed, the peoples of Nasca 3 times were spread out all over the Río Grande de Nazca drainage system region and were more or less separated into individual groups, where they lived in a most likely independent chiefdom governed areas.

== Death ==
=== Burials ===
Burials at Cahuachi vary in content and effort. Burial excavations at Cahuachi were carried out by Strong, Kroeber, Doering, Farabee, Orefici, and Silverman. Types of graves include some human remains crudely buried in shallow graves, while others are in somewhat more complex, underground tombs. Almost all of the tombs at Cahuachi have wooden cane roofs covered by huarngo logs. The huarango plant, it is important to recall, has ancestral connotations and symbolism in the region surrounding Cahuachi. These tombs were also found with grave markers, which were upright canes, sticking out of the ground from the roof of the tomb. Other types of graves include cylindrical shafts, or large vessel urns. The most abundant grave goods are Nasca pottery.

All of the graves vary in amount of mortuary content, from little to none, and vary in types of artifacts included. The most noteworthy aspect of the graves at Cahuachi, then, is the fact that none would be considered overly elaborate or "rich" when compared to graves of other cultures around this time period. Especially considering that Cahuachi is the largest adobe ceremonial center of its time. There is not an overabundance of pottery in any of the graves where it is found. There are some remnants of food stuffs and spondylus shell, even a small fragment near some skeletal remains of red pigment, but nothing as substantial as the elaborate graves of pre-Columbian cultures that so enthrall the archaeological world.

The bodies themselves were almost all in a flexed position, usually in their sides or sitting, with their bodies, or at least their heads, facing south. Another thing that almost all of the remains had in common was that they were wrapped in, or laid on top of, elaborately woven and embroidered textiles. Textile specialization was one of the few productions that the Nasca people during the apogee of Cahuachi practiced. These textiles came in different colors, varying grave to grave. Some were white, or tan, others were even black, red, or green, and had embroidered or weaved iconography and decoration as well. Textiles at Cahuachi, although second in quantity to Nasca ceramics, are the best indicators of status in a grave. That being said, it is still not that much information, because of the lack of grave goods in general.

One example of differentiation in burials, possibly due to status, was two adult, most likely males, that were both buried within tombs (not associated with each other), but one of them did not have any grave goods at all, while the other contained three pots. Presumably one was of a higher status than the other. However, Nasca ceramics in general are the most abundant artifacts at Cahuachi and carry a variety of different information and meaning. Therefore, there is not enough information or sample to create a hierarchical social classification for the people buried with them of the different types of pottery, besides the distinction between plainware and fineware, and even then who is to say which in each distinction is better?

Other factors need to be considered before there can be a definitive answer, like what were the contents or uses of the vessels and were these actually more important than the vessels themselves? Some Nasca people were wrapped in better woven and decorated textiles than others (Silverman (1993), p. 216). It can be argued that there is a status differentiation in Nasca society based on the iconography and labor investment in textiles and the importance of textile production at Cahuachi. Pertaining to social status as well, some of the burials had deformed head shapes. Causes of death include sacrifice, or death in warfare, and of course more or less natural deaths. Children usually had the most elaborate burials. There were also adult males and females unearthed as well, varying in elaboration equally in their burials. Some of the adult, presumably males, were in poor condition where they had half of their teeth missing well before death and very worn bones, while other graves contained just the opposite: younger adult females, where the wisdom teeth had not broken through yet, with all of the teeth still present and in seemingly normal health as pertaining to the rest of the bones.

=== Trophy heads ===
There were multitudes of trophy heads recovered from the cemeteries of Cahuachi. Excavators Kroeber, Strong, Doering all found heads – or conversely bodies with heads missing – that indicate the practice of trophy head taking. Nasca trophy head taking occurs with warfare, ritual battles, and sacrificial practices. Nasca trophy heads are found in Nasca cemeteries, usually in tombs of other burials. It has been interpreted that the ritualistic reasoning behind taking the heads was “a ceremonial means of gathering the life – or soul – force of enemies,” and done during warfare where the main purpose of which was territorial expansion. Kroeber's excavations include a burial where the head was missing, as well as a “nest of three trophy heads” in a separate grave, and six other trophy heads lining a tomb. Strong recovered in his excavations a head and vessel associated with each other. Nasca trophy heads have been known to be placed in large vessels in cemeteries.

Doering found at the front of a tomb, a line of nine trophy heads with plaited hair, and where two of them were on a bed of coca leaves. Silverman's team discovered a young adult male head, and is a classic example of a Nasca trophy head: The head exhibits frontal-occipital cranial deformation. Its eyes, eyebrows, beard, and mustache are present. The dark straight hair is elaborately braided. The skin is preserved but brittle. The scalp exhibits a series of deliberate incisions made with a sharp instrument. The tongue was removed. The lips were sealed with two splinters of huarango wood. A carrying cord emerges through a hole in the frontal bone. The cheeks were stuffed with plainweave cotton cloth.

== Warfare and violence ==
Cahuachi is surrounded by cemeteries and burials. This is because it was a prominent ceremonial center, though, not because of any widespread violence or warfare. Many of the burials at Cahuachi have not been fully excavated yet, and the bodies that have been recovered have not been unwrapped and studied yet either. This means that there is little evidence of violence, not because it was absent, but because it just has not been discovered. So, it is not to say that the Nasca people did not experience violence whatsoever. As briefly discussed above, trophy heads found around the site of Cahuachi can be interpreted as evidence for warfare and violence. Iconography on late Paracas style pottery is also evidence of head hunting practices.

The context of the head taking, though, is still being widely worked out. There is some contention about whether the trophy heads were taken during actual territorial warfare, or were taken in staged ritualistic battles. The biggest problem that occurs with the idea of territorial conquest and warfare, at least in an early Nasca state, is that there is little to no archaeological evidence of any kind to support it, and so was most likely not the context in which the actual early Nasca trophy heads were found. Archaeological evidence does, however, shows an interesting increase in head hunting, between early and late Nasca times, right around when Cahuachi was finally abandoned, and when a more militaristic lifestyle became prevalent in late Nasca art. This can be taken to mean that while early Nasca times revolved around a religious center, they were stable and able to create Cahuchi, and therefore there was less violent conquest and territorial warfare than at other times.

One aspect about the use or meaning of the trophy heads, is that all can agree that in whatever situation they were acquired in, it was religious/ritualistic in nature. Whether it be the head of an enemy in battle or ritual battle, headtaking was done for reasons of acquiring power, status, or safety from the enemy's soul. There is also iconographic evidence that suggests that after the abandonment of Cahuachi, that as headhunting became more "secularized," the elite class shifted from being made up of priests and ceremonial figureheads, to being successful headhunters.

== Nasca iconography ==
There is no archaeological evidence of writing at the site of Cahuachi. There is an abundance of Nasca style pottery at the site, however, and more specifically, much decorated fineware.

Some of the painting and decoration on the pottery is Nasca iconography: Nasca iconography can range in subject from trophy heads or warrior head takers, as previously mentioned, and mythical anthropomorphic figures, to everyday subjects that can display a chief or priest, a coca chewer, farmer, fisherman, "impersonator of gods" (masked ritual performer), musician, or llama-tender. These are roles are usually portrayed by men in Nasca pottery. Women are usually displayed carrying firewood, or reclined in "voluptuous seated form", squatting in childbirth, and also chewing coca. These are general images shown in Nasca pottery throughout the Nasca culture, and are not all found specifically at Cahuachi. Nasca pottery did, however, reach "an aesthetic and technological peak in EIP 3, corresponding to the apogee of Cahuachi".

Being that Cahuachi has an abundance of regular pottery, most likely for food and feasting purposes, but also a mass of fine pottery that is mostly associated with burials and ceremonial purposes, and the fact that fine pottery in Nasca society expressed religious as well as world views, there is much iconography to be collected at Cahuachi. Other types of images, like those portrayed in monumental style decorated pottery, display more natural figures, mostly birds. Another interesting aspect of Nasca iconography is what is not portrayed. Children never appear in Nasca iconography. Also, there is no hierarchy of scale in Nasca iconography; there are no figures larger than any others, or surrounded by smaller and therefore inferior images, that would indicate a difference in status or class.

== Decline of Cahuachi ==
The change in use of the site, Cahuachi, from a prominent non-urban ceremonial center and pilgrimage destination during its apogee in Nasca 3 times to it only being largely used for burials, marks the decline of Cahuachi. This change in function occurred during Nasca 4 times, or early Intermediate Period epoch 4. The architecture at the site during this time was mostly abandoned, but did have "postapogee" offerings, like the trophy heads. As time went on from this point, Cahuachi was used less and less for ceremonial services, production, and ritual, and became exclusively a place to bury the dead. The evidence for the decline of Cahuachi comes from the archaeological record of Nasca pottery present, or absent, from the site as well as the abundance of burials and cemeteries surrounding Cahuachi that are dated by their association with late Nasca pottery. Presence of Nasca 4 sherds in some of the fill of the Room of the Posts proves that there was still Nasca people present at the site and that there was some continued ceremonial use, albeit not as much as during its apogee.

Pottery that dates to Nasca 6 and 7 times found in many of the burials at Cahuachi are also evidence of Cahuachi's use during this time as mainly a burial site. The absence of abundant pottery use and any other evidence of ritual use or otherwise within and around the actual architecture of the site suggest that these constructions were abandoned after Nasca 5 times. The reason for the decline of Cahuachi is as yet, unknown, but the fall of their largest central ceremonial center and heart of the Nasca cult signifies the decline of the entire Nasca culture throughout the region. However, archaeological findings of Orefici suggest that Cahuachi was abandoned around 450–500 CE, due to a severe drought and after severe mudslides and earthquakes.

== Sources ==
- Bacha, Aïcha Bachir; Jacinto, Llanos; Daniel, Óscar (2006). "El Gran Templo del centro ceremonial de Cahuachi (Nazca, Perú)" [The great central ceremonial temple at Cahuachi (Nazca, Peru)]. Dimensión Antropológica (in Spanish). 38: 49−86.
- Lasaponara, Rosa; Masini, N.; Orefici, G. (2016). The Ancient Nasca World: New insights from science and archaeology. Springer International Publishing. doi:10.1007/978-3-319-47052-8. ISBN 978-3-319-47052-8 – via springer.com/book.
- Orefici, G. (2003). Nasca: Hipótesis y evidencias de su desarrollo cultural. Lima, PE: Centro Italiano Studi e Ricerche Archelologiche Precolombiane.
- Orefici, G. (2012). Cahuachi: Capital teocratica Nasca. Lima, PE: Pressa de Universidad de San Martin de Porres.
- Proulx, Donald A. (2007). Nasca Ceramic Iconography: An overview. Amherst, MA: University of Massachusetts Press.
- Rowe, John H. (9–14 November 1959). "Nuevos datos relativos a la cronología del estilo Nasca" ["New data regarding the chronology of Nasca styles" ]. In Matos Mendieta, Ramiro (ed.). Antiguo Perú: Espacio y tiempo – trabajos presentados a la Semana de Arqueología Peruana [Ancient Peru: Space and time – works presented at the seminar on Peruvian archeology] . Semana de Arqueología Peruana [Seminar on Peruvian Archeology] (in Spanish). Lima, PE: Librería-Editorial J. Mejía Baca. pp. 29–45. LCCN 61021867. OCLC 4791728. OL 17094577M.;
- Silverman, Helaine (1986). Cahuachi: An Andean ceremonial center (Ph.D. thesis). Austin, TX: University of Texas.
- Silverman, Helaine (1988). "Cahuachi: Non-urban cultural complexity on the south coast of Peru". Journal of Field Archaeology. 15 (4): 403–430. doi:10.2307/530044. JSTOR 530044.
- Silverman, Helaine (1993). Cahuachi in the Ancient Nasca World. Iowa City, IA: University of Iowa Press. ISBN 978-1-58729-471-6 – via Google books.
- Silverman, Helaine (1994). "The archaeological identification of an ancient Peruvian pilgrimage center". World Archaeology. 26 (1): 1–18. doi:10.1080/00438243.1994.9980257. JSTOR 124860.
- Silverman, Helaine (2002). Ancient Nasca Settlement and Society. Iowa City, IA: University of Iowa Press.
- Strong, William Duncan (1957). "Paracas, Nazca, and Tiahuanacoid cultural relationships in south coastal Peru". Memoirs of the Society for American Archaeology. 13.
- Valdez, Lidio M. (January 1994). "Cahuachi: New evidence for an early Nasca ceremonial role". Current Anthropology. 35 (5): 675–679. doi:10.1086/204330. JSTOR 2744095. S2CID 144704773.
