= Heritage (journal) =

Peer-reviewed open-access scientific journal that covers heritage science

- Discipline: Heritage science
- Language: English
- Edited by: Nicola Masini, Francesco Soldovieri

Publication details
- History: 2018–present
- Publisher: MDPI
- Frequency: Continuous
- Open access: Yes
- License: Creative Commons Attribution License
- Impact factor: 1.7 (2022)

Standard abbreviations
- ISO 4: Heritage (Basel)

Indexing
- ISSN: 2571-9408
- OCLC no.: 1076438364

Links
- Journal homepage

Heritage is a peer-reviewed open-access scientific journal that covers various areas of heritage science, including conservation and management of natural and cultural heritage. It is published by MDPI and was established in 2018. The editor-in-chief is Nicola Masini of Italy's National Research Council, along with Francesco Soldovieri.

Articles in the journal have been referenced by mainstream news media including BBC News, The Times of India, and The New Indian Express. The journal has been discussed positively by Retraction Watch.

== Abstracting and indexing ==
The journal is abstracted and indexed in relevant scientific databases, including Directory of Open Access Journals, ProQuest databases, ESCI Emerging Sources Citation Index and Scopus. Heritage has been recognized by the Italian National Agency for the Evaluation of Universities and Research Institutes ANVUR as class A journal for Area 08 C1/E1/E2/F1. Heritage has a 2022 impact factor of 1.7.

== See also ==
- Open access
- Peer review
