= Gerardo Masini =

Argentine-Italian footballer

Personal information
- Date of birth: December 31, 1982 (age 43)
- Place of birth: Cipolletti, Argentina
- Height: 1.84 m (6 ft 1/2 in)
- Position: Striker

Youth career
- –2001: Club Cipolletti
- 2001–2003: Independiente

Senior career*
Years	Team	Apps	(Gls)
1999–2001	Club Cipolletti	4	(0)
2001–2003	Independiente	0	(0)
2003–2004	Penne	35	(6)
2005	Lauretum	13	(1)
2005–2006	Club Cipolletti	12	(4)
2006–2007	Canistro	?	(15)
2007	Salernitana	14	(1)
2008	Cassino	9	(0)
2008	Potenza	13	(0)
2009	Alzira	13	(3)
2009–2010	Zamora	37	(3)
2010–2011	Luco Canistro	24	(11)
2011–2012	Teramo	31	(20)
2012–2013	Ischia	47	(17)
2014	Martina	11	(2)
2014–2015	Rimini	19	(4)
2015–2016	Virtus Francavilla	35	(11)
2016	Poggibonsi	0	(0)
2016–2018	Francavilla	50	(12)
2018–2019	Latina	34	(4)
2020	Avezzano	7	(0)
- * Club domestic league appearances and goals

Gerardo Masini (born December 31, 1982, in Cipolletti) is a retired Argentine professional football player. He holds an Italian citizenship.

== Career ==
=== Club career ===
He played on professional level in Lega Pro Prima Divisione for Salernitana Calcio 1919 and Potenza S.C. and in Lega Pro Seconda Divisione for Cassino, Ischia Isolaverde and Martina.

In September 2010, he was signed by Serie D club Luco Canistro. Subsequently, he played with Teramo Calcio, Ischia Isolaverde, Martina, Rimini, Virtus Francavilla, Poggibonsi, F.C. Francavilla, Latina and Avezzano.
