= Antonio Mesina =

Italian footballer (born 1993)

Personal information
- Date of birth: 11 January 1993 (age 33)
- Place of birth: Nuoro, Sardinia, Italy
- Height: 1.77 m (5 ft 10 in)
- Position: Forward

Team information
- Current team: Costa Orientale Sarda

Youth career
- Budoni
- Ascoli

Senior career*
Years	Team	Apps	(Gls)
2011–2017	Budoni		
2013–2014	→ Samassi (loan)		
2014–2015	→ Castiadas (loan)		
2015–2016	→ Muravera (loan)		
2016–2017	→ Tonara (loan)		
2017–2019	Castiadas		(23+)
2019–2020	Arezzo	9	(1)
2020–2021	Torres	12	(0)
2021	Gelbison	13	(5)
2021–2022	Sestri Levante	38	(16)
2022	Casale	14	(5)
2022–2023	Sanremese	3	(1)
2024–	Costa Orientale Sarda	0	(0)
- * Club domestic league appearances and goals as of 7 May 2023

Antonio Mesina (born 11 January 1993) is an Italian footballer who plays as a forward for Costa Orientale Sarda in Serie D.

== Career ==
Mesina spent the majority of his early career being loaned about Sardinia, finally settling at Castiadas in 2017. In his first season with the club, Mesina scored 23 league goals, which led to him being crowned the top scorer of the Eccellenza, Italy's fifth tier.

In July 2019, Masina moved to Serie C club Arezzo. He made his league debut for the club on 25 August 2019, coming on as an 85th minute substitute for Aniello Cutolo in a 3–1 home victory over Lecco.

On 8 October 2020 he moved to Torres in Serie D.
