= Masina, Rolpa =

Masina मसिना
- Village development committee
- Location in Nepal
- Coordinates: 28.15°N 82.58°E
- Country: Nepal
- Zone: Rapti Zone
- District: Rolpa District

Population (1991)
  - Total: 3,881
- Time zone: UTC+5:45 (Nepal Time)

VDC Map of Rolpa District

Masina is a village development committee in Rolpa District in the Rapti Zone of north-eastern Nepal. At the time of the 1991 Nepal census it had a population of 3881 people living in 719 individual households.
