= Messina (disambiguation) =

Messina is the third largest city in Sicily.

Messina may also refer to:

== Places ==
- Province of Messina, a former Italian province
- Strait of Messina, Italy
- Messina, South Africa (now called Musina)
- Messina Chasmata, a system of canyons on the Uranian moon Titania

== Other uses ==
- Messina (name), a surname
- Messina Conference, a 1955 conference which led to the creation of the European Economic Community
- Messina (album), a 2012 album by French singer-songwriter Damien Saez
- F.C. Messina Peloro, a football club based in Messina
- SS Messina, a German cargo ship
- 18 Infantry Division Messina, an Italian division during World War II
- Messina, a fictional small town in John Grisham's Bleachers

== See also ==
- Mesina (disambiguation)
- Messenia, a region in Greece
