= Nicola Masini =

Italian scientist (born 1965)

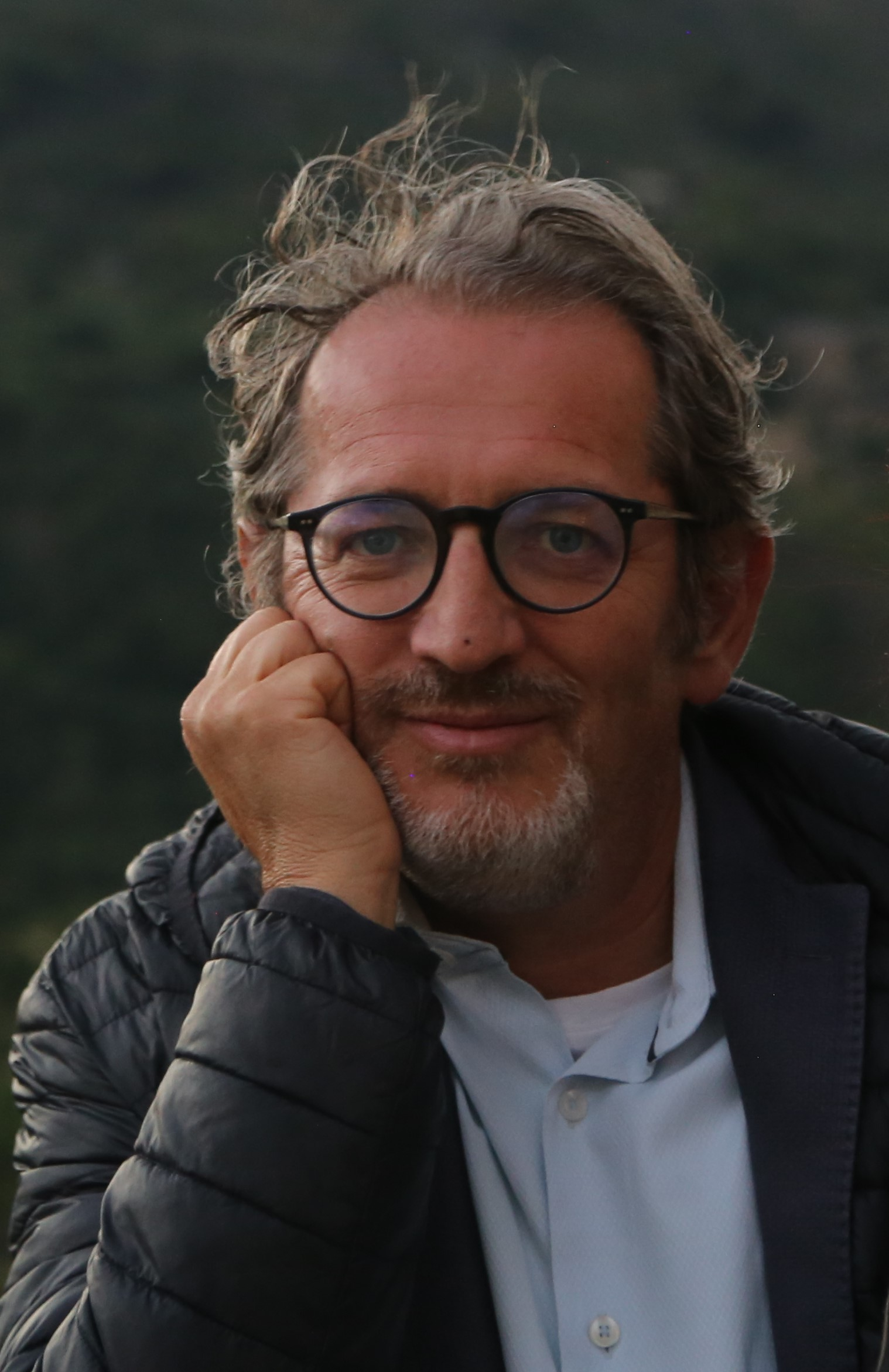
Nicola Masini

Nicola Masini (born 1965) is an Italian scientist with CNR, noted for his work on exploring traces of Andean civilizations in Peru and Bolivia using spatial technologies and Remote Sensing.

== Biography ==
Masini graduated in Engineering in 1990. He became Researcher with the Consiglio Nazionale delle Ricerche in 1995, Senior scientist at CNR-IBAM in 2003, Research Director of CNR-Institute of heritage Science in 2020, Professor of Fundamentals of Restoration at the University of Basilicata since 2002, Editor in Chief of Heritage. His dominant scientific interest is the application and the development of new approaches to archaeological research by integrating satellite remote sensing, LiDAR, and geophysical prospecting.

He has directed Italian Conservation heritage and Archaeogeophysics Mission in Peru since 2007. From 2007 to 2015, he has been directing several scientific investigations at the Nasca ceremonial center of Cahuachi, Pachacamac, Tiwanaku, Machu Picchu, Chankillo, Kuelap, and a number of archaeological sites in the Nasca Province and Lambayeque region.

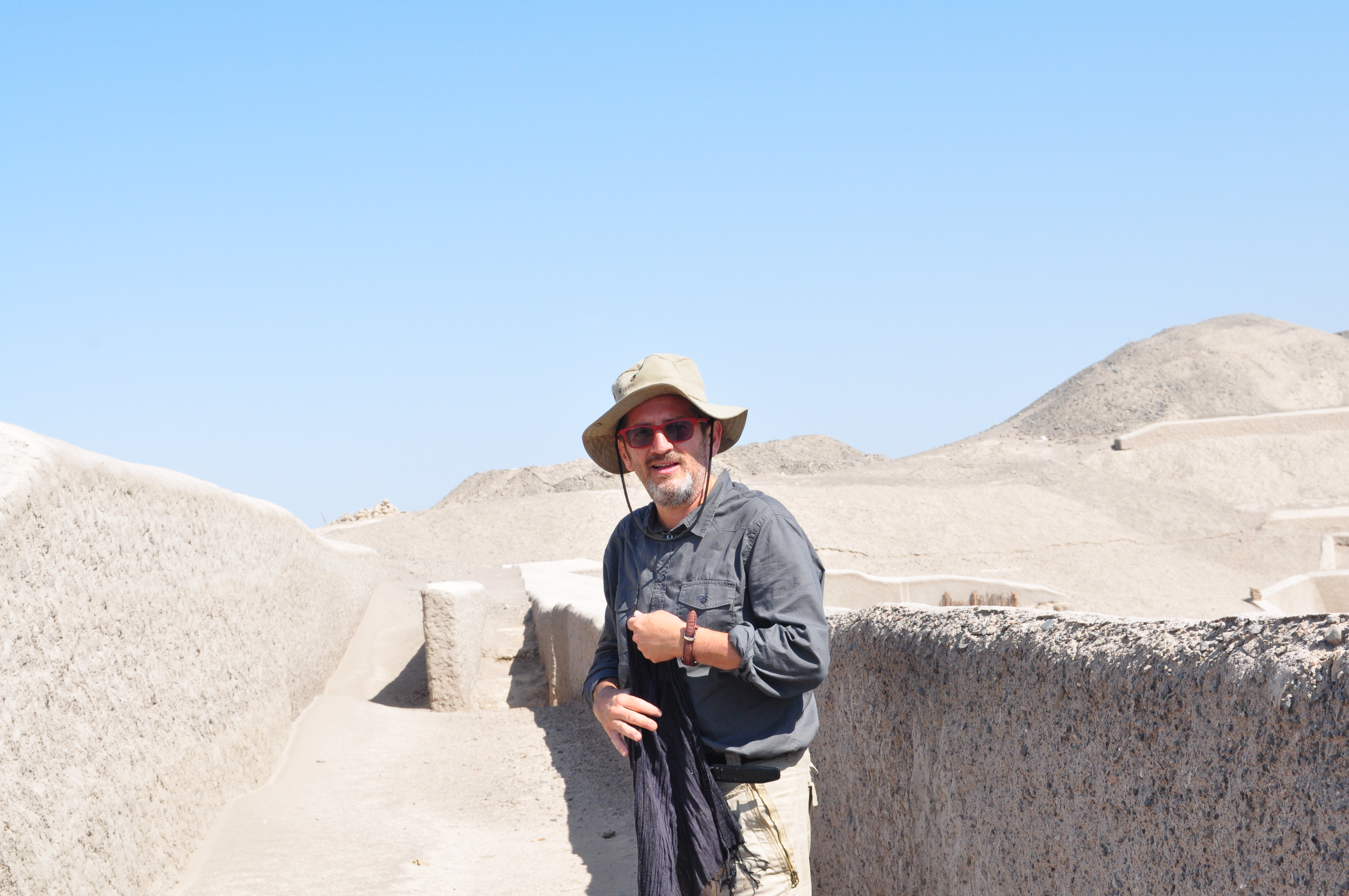
Nicola Masini - Cahuachi 2016

Achievements of the ITACA Mission include the discovery of a settlement on the riverbed of the Nasca (2008), a number of findings in some of the Cahuachi temples (2008–10), the monitoring of archaeological looting in South and North Peru (2011), and study of the ancient channeling in Pachacamac (2012–14). Nicola Masini, investigating some geoglyphs in Pampa de Atarco near the Ceremonial center of Cahuachi contributed to providing a new hypothesis on the Nasca lines. The research conducted between 2013 and 2015, using remote sensing, along with Giuseppe Orefici and Rosa Lasaponara, put in evidence a spatial, functional, and religious relationship between these geoglyphs and the temples of Cahuachi.

Since 2013, he has been chief advisor of a research project with the Chinese Academy of Sciences in Henan (China) focusing on the use of digital space technologies for archaeological investigations and the management of cultural resources. He is currently conducting investigations using satellite imagery, including SAR, to identify unknown sites and routes along the old Silk Road. Since 2005, in Southern Italy, he has been conducting some remote sensing-based investigations on medieval settlements abandoned in the Late Middle Ages. In 2018, using LiDAR, he was able to discover a fortified settlement under the canopy in the north of Basilicata. Finally, between 2017 and 2019, investigations carried out at Machu Picchu allowed the reconstruction of the landscape before the construction of the Inca monumental complex.

== Current research ==
His scientific interest centers on the application and development of methodologies for the conservation of cultural heritage and archaeological research. His interdisciplinary approach draws on spatial technologies, non-invasive diagnostics, and geophysics in a holistic vision that brings together history, archaeology, and conservation

== Scientific books and papers ==
=== Books ===
- Lasaponara, Rosa; Masini, Nicola (2012). Satellite Remote Sensing: A New Tool for Archaeology (PDF). Vol. 16. Dordrecht: Springer Netherlands. doi:10.1007/978-90-481-8801-7. ISBN 978-90-481-8800-0.
- Lasaponara, Rosa; Masini, Nicola; Orefici, Giuseppe (2017-01-20). The Ancient Nasca World: New Insights from Science and Archaeology. Springer. ISBN 978-3-319-47052-8.
- Masini, Nicola; Soldovieri, Francesco (2017). Sensing the Past: From artifact to historical site. Vol. 16. Cham: Springer International Publishing. doi:10.1007/978-3-319-50518-3. ISBN 978-3-319-50516-9.
- Ziółkowski, Mariusz; Masini, Nicola; Bastante, José M. (2022-10-21). Machu Picchu in Context: Interdisciplinary Approaches to the Study of Human Past. Cham: Springer International Publishing. doi:10.1007/978-3-030-92766-0. ISBN 978-3-030-92765-3.

=== Papers ===
- Masini, Nicola; Lasaponara, Rosa; Orefici, Giuseppe (2009). "Addressing the challenge of detecting archaeological adobe structures in Southern Peru using QuickBird imagery". Journal of Cultural Heritage. 10. Elsevier BV: e3–e9. doi:10.1016/j.culher.2009.10.005. ISSN 1296-2074.
- Lasaponara, Rosa; Masini, Nicola; Rizzo, Enzo; Orefici, Giuseppe (2011). "New discoveries in the Piramide Naranjada in Cahuachi (Peru) using satellite, Ground Probing Radar and magnetic investigations". Journal of Archaeological Science. 38 (9): 2031–2039. Bibcode:2011JArSc..38.2031L. doi:10.1016/j.jas.2010.12.010.
- Lasaponara, Rosa; Masini, Nicola (2014). "Beyond modern landscape features: New insights in the archaeological area of Tiwanaku in Bolivia from satellite data". International Journal of Applied Earth Observation and Geoinformation. 26. Elsevier BV: 464–471. Bibcode:2014IJAEO..26..464L. doi:10.1016/j.jag.2013.09.006. ISSN 1569-8432.
- Masini, Nicola; Orefici, Giuseppe; Danese, Maria; Pecci, Antonio; et al. (2016). "Cahuachi and Pampa de Atarco: Towards Greater Comprehension of Nasca Geoglyphs". The Ancient Nasca World. Cham: Springer International Publishing. pp. 239–278. doi:10.1007/978-3-319-47052-8_12. ISBN 978-3-319-47050-4.
- Jiang, Aihui; Chen, Fulong; Masini, Nicola; Capozzoli, Luigi; et al. (2017-08-03). "Archeological crop marks identified from Cosmo-SkyMed time series: the case of Han-Wei capital city, Luoyang, China" (PDF). International Journal of Digital Earth. 10 (8): 846–860. Bibcode:2017IJDE...10..846J. doi:10.1080/17538947.2016.1254686. hdl:11586/190982. ISSN 1753-8947.
- Masini, Nicola; Gizzi, Fabrizio Terenzio; Biscione, Marilisa; Fundone, Vincenzo; et al. (2018-10-09). "Medieval Archaeology Under the Canopy with LiDAR. The (Re)Discovery of a Medieval Fortified Settlement in Southern Italy". Remote Sensing. 10 (10): 1598. Bibcode:2018RemS...10.1598M. doi:10.3390/rs10101598. ISSN 2072-4292.
- Masini, Nicola; Lasaponara, Rosa (2020). "Satellite and close range analysis for the surveillance and knowledge improvement of the Nasca geoglyphs". Remote Sensing of Environment. 236 111447. Elsevier BV. Bibcode:2020RSEnv.23611447M. doi:10.1016/j.rse.2019.111447. hdl:11563/141457. ISSN 0034-4257.
- Masini, Nicola; Romano, Gerardo; Sieczkowska, Dominika; Capozzoli, Luigi; et al. (2023-09-25). "Non invasive subsurface imaging to investigate the site evolution of Machu Picchu" (PDF). Scientific Reports. 13 (1) 16035. Bibcode:2023NatSR..1316035M. doi:10.1038/s41598-023-43361-x. ISSN 2045-2322. PMC 10519973. PMID 37749316.

== Bibliography ==
- Aimi, A. (2015). Arqueólogos Intelectuales Italianos en el Peru. Lima: Instituto Italiano de Cultura de Lima. pp. 47–48.
- Sartini, R. (2014). "Passa per lo Spazio la nuova Via della Seta" (PDF). Il Nodo di Gordio (4): 27–33.
