= Nazca lines =

Geoglyphs in the Nazca Desert, Peru

Lines and Geoglyphs of Nasca and Palpa Cultures
UNESCO World Heritage Site
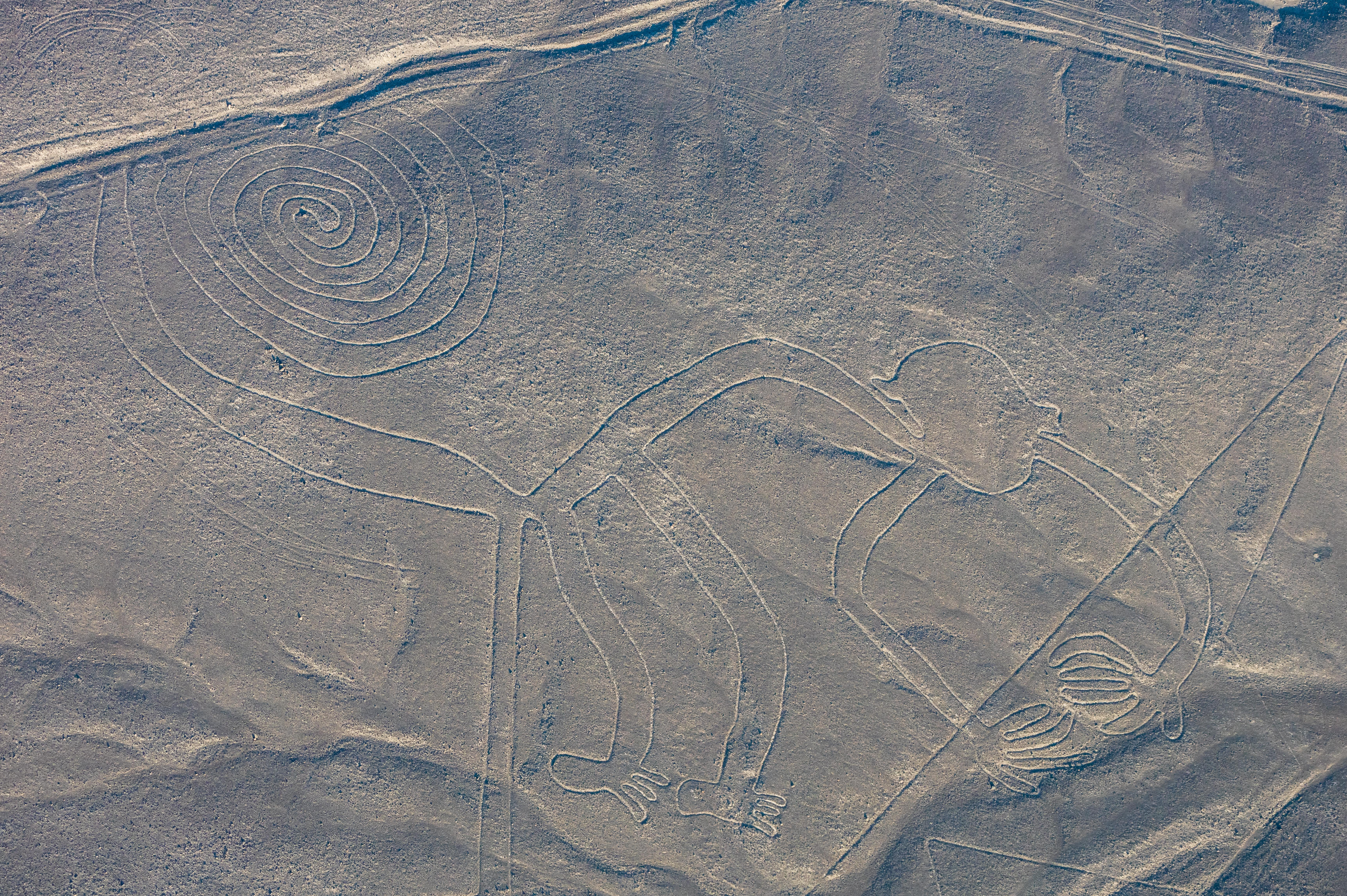
- Aerial photograph of one of the Nazca lines, taken in July 2015, that shows the design known as "the monkey"

- Location within Peru
- Location: Southern Peru, South America
- Criteria: Cultural: i, iii, iv
- Reference: 700
- Inscription: 1994 (18th Session)
- Area: 75,358.47 ha (186,214.8 acres)
- Coordinates: 14°41′51″S 75°08′06″W

The Nazca lines (/ˈnɑːzkə/, /-kɑː/) are a group of geoglyphs made in the soil of the Nazca Desert in southern Peru. The area was designated a UNESCO World Heritage Site in 1994. The lines were created between 500 BC and 500 AD by people making depressions or shallow incisions in the desert floor, removing pebbles and leaving different-colored dirt exposed. There are two major phases of the Nazca lines, Paracas phase, from 400 to 200 BC, and Nazca phase, from 200 BC to 500 AD. In the 21st century, several hundred new figures have been found with the use of drones, and archaeologists believe that there are more to be found.

Most lines run straight across the landscape, but there are also figurative designs of animals and plants. The combined length of all the lines is more than 1,300 km (800 mi), and the group covers an area of about 50 km^{2} (19 sq mi). The lines are typically 10 to 15 cm (4–6 in) deep. They were made by removing the top layer of reddish-brown ferric oxide–coated pebbles to reveal a yellow-grey subsoil. The width of the lines varies considerably, but more than half are slightly more than 33 cm (13 in) wide. In some places they may be only 30 cm (12 in) wide, and in others reach 1.8 m (6 ft) wide.

Some of the Nazca lines form shapes that are best seen from the air (at around 500 m [1,600 ft]), although they are also visible from the surrounding foothills and other high places. The shapes are usually made from one continuous line. The largest ones are about 370 m (400 yd) long. Because of its isolation and the dry, windless, stable climate of the plateau, the lines have mostly been preserved naturally. Extremely rare changes in weather may temporarily alter the general designs. As of 2012, the lines are said to have been deteriorating because of an influx of squatters inhabiting the lands.

The figures vary in complexity. Hundreds are simple lines and geometric shapes; more than 70 are zoomorphic designs, including a hummingbird, arachnid, fish, condor, heron, monkey, lizard, dog, cat, and a human. Other shapes include trees and flowers. Scholars differ in interpreting the purpose of the designs, but in general, they ascribe religious significance to them.

== Location ==
The high, arid plateau stretches more than 80 km (50 mi) between the towns of Nazca and Palpa on the Pampas de Jumana, approximately 400 km (250 mi) south of Lima. The main PE-1S Panamericana Sur runs parallel to it. The main concentration of designs is in a 10 by 4 km (6 by 2 mi) rectangle, south of the hamlet of San Miguel de la Pascana. In this area, the most notable geoglyphs are visible.

== Recorded history ==
The first published mention of the Nazca Lines was by Spanish conquistador Pedro Cieza de León in his 1553 book, where he described them as trail markers. In 1569, Spanish magistrate Luis Monzón reported having seen ancient ruins in Peru, including the remains of "roads".

Although the lines were partially visible from nearby hills, the first to report them in the twentieth century were Peruvian military and civilian pilots. In 1927, Peruvian archaeologist Toribio Mejía Xesspe spotted them while he was hiking through the foothills. He discussed them at a conference in Lima in 1939.

American historian Paul Kosok is credited as the first scholar to study the lines in depth. While in Peru in 1940–41 to study ancient irrigation systems, he flew over the lines and realized that one was in the shape of a bird. Another chance observation helped him see how lines converged on the horizon at the winter solstice in the Southern Hemisphere.

Kosok began to study how the lines might have been created, as well as to try to determine their purpose. He was joined by archaeologist Richard P. Schaedel from the United States, and Maria Reiche, a German mathematician and archaeologist from Lima, to try to determine the purpose of the Nazca Lines. They proposed that the figures were designed as astronomical markers on the horizon to show where the sun and other celestial bodies rose on significant dates. Archaeologists, historians, and mathematicians have all tried to determine the purpose of the lines.

Determining how they were made has been easier than determining why they were made. Scholars have theorized that the Nazca people could have used simple tools and surveying equipment to construct the lines. Archaeological surveys have found wooden stakes in the ground at the end of some lines, which supports this theory. One such stake was carbon-dated and was the basis for establishing the age of the design complex.

Joe Nickell, an American investigator of the paranormal, religious artifacts, and folk mysteries, reproduced the figures in the early twenty-first century by using the same tools and technology that would have been available to the Nazca people. In so doing, he refuted the 1969 hypothesis of Erich von Däniken, who suggested that "ancient astronauts" had constructed these works. With careful planning and simple technologies, Nickell proved that a small team of people could recreate even the largest figures within days, without any aerial assistance. Scientific American characterized Nickell's work as "remarkable in its exactness" when compared to the existing lines.

Most of the lines are formed on the ground by a shallow trench, with a depth between 10 and 15 cm (4 and 6 in). Such trenches were made by removing the reddish-brown, iron oxide-coated pebbles that cover the surface of the Nazca Desert. When this gravel is removed, the light-colored clay earth exposed in the bottom of the trench contrasts sharply in color and tone with the surrounding land surface, producing visible lines. This sub-layer contains high amounts of lime. With moisture from morning mist, it hardens to form a protective layer that shields the lines from winds, thereby preventing erosion.

The Nazca used this technique to "draw" several hundred simple, but huge, curvilinear animal and human figures. In total, the earthwork project is huge and complex: the area encompassing the lines is nearly 450 km^{2} (170 mi^{2}), and the largest figures can span nearly 370 m (1,200 ft). Some figures have been measured: the hummingbird is 93 m (305 ft) long, the condor is 134 m (440 ft), the monkey is 93 by 58 m (305 by 190 ft), and the spider is 47 m (154 ft). The very dry, windless, and constant climate of the Nazca region has preserved the lines well.

The discovery of two new small figures was announced in early 2011 by a Japanese team from Yamagata University. One of these resembles a human head and is dated to the early period of Nazca culture or earlier. The other, undated, is an animal. The team has been conducting fieldwork there since 2006, and by 2012 has found approximately 100 new geoglyphs. In March 2012, the university announced that it would open a new research center at the site in September 2012, related to a long-term project to study the area for the next 15 years.

A June 2019 article in Smithsonian magazine describes recent work by a multi-disciplinary team of Japanese researchers who identified or re-identified some of the birds depicted. They note that birds are the animals most frequently depicted in the Nazca geoglyphs. The team believes that some of the bird images that previous researchers assumed to be indigenous species more closely resemble exotic birds found in non-desert habitats. They speculated that "The reason exotic birds were depicted in the geoglyphs instead of indigenous birds is closely related to the purpose of the etching process."

The discovery of 143 new geoglyphs on the Nazca Pampa and in the surrounding area was announced in 2019 by Yamagata University and IBM Japan. One of these was found by using machine learning-based methods.

Lines forming the shape of a cat were discovered on a hill in 2020. The figure is on a steep slope prone to erosion, explaining why it had not previously been discovered until archaeologists carefully studied the image. Drones are revealing sites for further research.

The number of known Nazca geoglyphs amounted to 358 in 2022. Drones now are being used to assist the anthropologists researching the area and are expected to enable them to discover many more.

=== 2024 AI-assisted discoveries ===
In 2024, a team of archaeologists from the Yamagata University's Nazca Institute, in collaboration with IBM Research, used artificial intelligence (AI) to discover 303 previously unknown geoglyphs depicting parrots, cats, monkeys, killer whales, and even severed heads near the Nazca Lines in Peru.

The field survey took place between September 2022 and February 2023 and was conducted on foot for ground truthing under the permission of the Peruvian Ministry of Culture. It required 1,440 labor hours and resulted in 303 newly confirmed figurative geoglyphs. The 1,309 candidates with high potential were further sorted into three ranks. A total of 1,200 labor hours were spent screening the AI-model geoglyph candidate photos.

== Speculation regarding purpose ==
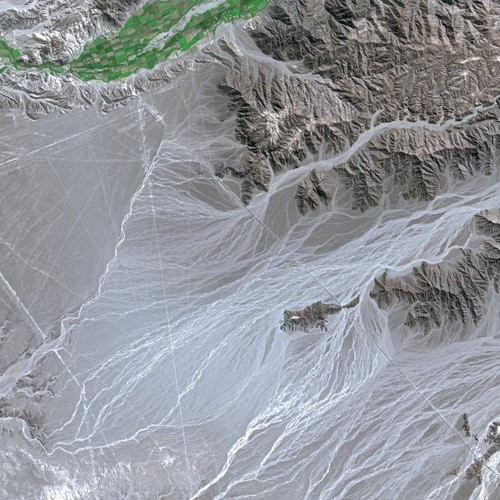
Nazca lines seen from SPOT satellite

=== Astronomical explanations ===
Paul Kosok and Maria Reiche advanced a purpose related to astronomy and cosmology, as has been common in monuments of other ancient cultures: the lines were intended to act as a kind of observatory, to point to the places on the distant horizon where the sun and other celestial bodies rose or set at the solstices. Many prehistoric indigenous cultures in the Americas and elsewhere constructed earthworks that combined such astronomical sighting with their religious cosmology, as did the late Mississippian culture at Cahokia and other sites in present-day United States. Another example is Stonehenge in England. Newgrange in Ireland has tombs that are oriented to admit light at the winter solstice.

Gerald Hawkins and Anthony Aveni, experts in archaeoastronomy, concluded in 1990 that the evidence was insufficient to support such an astronomical explanation.

Maria Reiche asserted that some or all of the figures represented constellations. By 1998, Phyllis B. Pitluga, a protégé of Reiche and senior astronomer at the Adler Planetarium in Chicago, had concluded that the animal figures were "not shapes of constellations, but of what might be called counter constellations, the irregularly-shaped dark patches within the twinkling expanse of the Milky Way." She asserted the giant spider figure is an anamorphic diagram of the constellation Orion, and that three of the straight lines leading to the figure were used to track the changing declinations of the three stars of Orion's Belt. Aveni has since critiqued her analysis, noting she did not account for the other 12 lines of the figure, and commented generally on her conclusions. For example:

I really had trouble finding good evidence to back up what she contended. Pitluga never laid out the criteria for selecting the lines she chose to measure, nor did she pay much attention to the archaeological data Clarkson and Silverman had unearthed. Her case did little justice to other information about the coastal cultures, save applying, with subtle contortions, Urton's representations of constellations from the highlands. As historian Jacquetta Hawkes might ask: was she getting the pampa she desired?

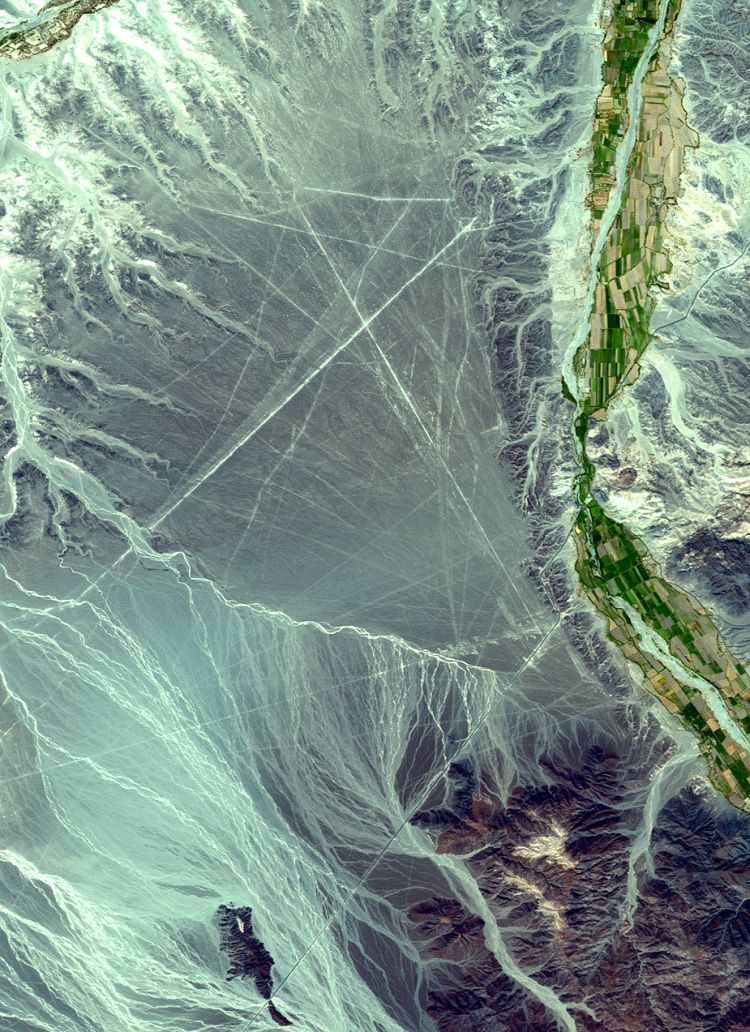
Satellite picture of an area containing lines: north is to the right (coordinates: 14.7°S 75.°W)

=== Cultural hypotheses ===
Some scholars argue that the role of shamanistic rituals within the Nazca culture could have influenced the creation of these geoglyphs throughout southern Peru.

Henri Stierlin, a Swiss art historian specializing in Egypt and the Middle East, published a book in 1983 linking the Nazca Lines to the production of ancient textiles that archeologists have found wrapping mummies of the Paracas culture. He contended that the people may have used the lines and trapezes as giant, primitive looms to fabricate the extremely long strings and wide pieces of textiles typical of the area. According to his theory, the figurative patterns (smaller and less common) were meant only for ritualistic purposes. This theory is not widely accepted, although scholars have noted similarities in patterns between the textiles and the Nazca Lines. They interpret these similarities as arising from the common culture.

The first systematic field study of the geoglyphs was made by Markus Reindel and Johny Cuadrado Isla. Since 1996, they have documented and excavated more than 650 sites. They compared the iconography of the lines to ceramics of the cultures. As archeologists, they believe that the figurative motifs of geoglyphs can be dated to having been made between 600 and 200 BC.

=== Role of water ===
In 1985, archaeologist Johan Reinhard published archaeological, ethnographic, and historical data demonstrating that worship of mountains and other water sources predominated in Nazca religion and economy from ancient to recent times. He theorized that the lines and figures were part of religious practices involving the worship of deities associated with the availability of water, which directly related to the success and productivity of crops. He interpreted the lines as sacred paths leading to places where these deities could be worshiped. The figures were symbols representing animals and objects meant to invoke the aid of the deities in supplying water. The precise meanings of many of the individual geoglyphs remain unknown.

Based on the results of geophysical investigations and the observation of geological faults, David Johnson argued that some geoglyphs followed the paths of aquifers from which aqueducts (or puquios) collected water.

=== Modern multi-functional theories ===
Theories have posited that the geometric lines could indicate water flow or irrigation schemes, or be a part of rituals to "summon" water, whereas spiders, birds, and plants may be fertility symbols. It also has been theorized that the lines could act as an astronomical calendar. Alberto Rossel Castro (1977) proposed a multi-functional interpretation of the geoglyphs. He classified them into three groups: the first appeared to be tracks connected to irrigation and field division, the second are lines that are axes connected with mounds and cairns, and the third was linked to astronomical interpretations.

Nicola Masini and Giuseppe Orefici have conducted research in Pampa de Atarco, about 10 km (6 mi) south of Pampa de Nasca, which they believe reveals a spatial, functional and religious relationship between these geoglyphs and the temples of Cahuachi. In particular, using remote sensing techniques (from satellite to drone based remote sensing), they investigated and found "five groups of geoglyphs, each of them characterized by a specific motif and shape, and associated with a distinct function." They identified a ceremonial one, characterized by meandering motifs. Another is related to calendrical purpose, as proved by the presence of radial centers aligned along the directions of winter solstice and equinox sunset. As have earlier scholars, the two Italians believe that the geoglyphs were the venues of events linked to the agriculture calendar. These also served to strengthen social cohesion among various groups of pilgrims, sharing common ancestors and religious beliefs.

Using a deep neural network trained on ImageNet and fine-tuned on 'relief-type' geoglyphs, a 2024 paper classified geoglyphs by walking route (either trail or road) and whether they were 'geometric' or 'figurative.' The geometric geoglyphs were then labeled either 'linear' or 'areal,' and the figurative geoglyphs either 'line-type' or 'relief-type.' The authors focus on figurative geoglyphs, hypothesizing that "since the main motifs of the line-type geoglyphs are wild animals, it is probable that ceremonial activities related to these animals were performed during pilgrimages"; the line-types can thus "be regarded as planned public architecture." They also find that the relief-type geoglyphs, often half the length of the line-types, could be recognized from walking trails: "The main motifs of the relief-type geoglyphs were humans, livestock, and human sacrifice, all of which depict scenes with humans or things modified by humans. Repeatedly observing relief-type geoglyphs from the trails probably facilitated sharing information about human activities related to these scenes."

=== Pseudoscientific extraterrestrial origin ===
Swiss pseudoscientific writer Erich von Däniken was fascinated by Nazca and was also a strong believer in extraterrestrial visitations. Von Däniken published a best-selling book titled Chariots of the Gods? in 1968. In this book he describes his theory that the lines were used as landing sites for UFOs. Däniken claimed that the Nazca lines site reflected visits by astronauts from other worlds, who became the creators of ancient civilizations. According to Von Däniken, Sanskrit literature describes a story in which an aircraft landed on Earth, and the local people watched in amazement as "human-like beings with golden, shimmering skins" walked, mined for metals and then flew away in their ship. These ancient astronauts supposedly soon returned where they built landing tracks and then eventually left forever. The amazed Native Americans then considered Nazca a place of pilgrimage and generations of their people built more figures and runways as an invitation for gods to return, but they never did.

At the time of Erich von Däniken's publishing of Chariots of the Gods?, scientists and archeologists such as Maria Reiche declared that his ideas were absurd and should be discarded. These scientists and archeologists also were able to prove that these lines could have been made using simple tools that would have been available to the people at the time they were created. Erich von Däniken's books Arrival of the Gods and Chariots of the Gods? were considered to not have any intellectual credibility or literary merit. Before Von Däniken's work, other authors had presented ideas of extraterrestrial contact with ancient humans, but he failed to credit these authors, even when making the same claims and also using identical or similar evidence. Nevertheless, Von Däniken's books drew in thousands of visitors and believers to the site.

== Preservation and environmental concerns ==
Conservationists who seek to preserve the Nazca Lines are concerned about threats of pollution and erosion in the region.

The Lines themselves are superficial, they are only 10 to 30 cm (4 to 12 in) deep and could be washed away... Nazca has only ever received a small amount of rain. But now there are great changes to the weather all over the world. The Lines cannot resist heavy rain without being damaged.

— Viktoria Nikitzki of the Maria Reiche Centre

After flooding and mudslides in the area in mid-February 2007, Mario Olaechea Aquije, archaeological resident from Peru's National Institute of Culture, and a team of specialists surveyed the area. He said, "[T]he mudslides and heavy rains did not appear to have caused any significant damage to the Nazca Lines". He noted that the nearby Southern Pan-American Highway did suffer damage, and "the damage done to the roads should serve as a reminder to just how fragile these figures are."

In 2012, squatters occupied land in the area, damaging a Nazca-era cemetery and allowing their pigs to have access to some of the land.

In 2013, machinery used in a limestone quarry was reported to have destroyed a small section of a line, and caused damage to another.

In December 2014, a controversy arose involving Greenpeace activity on the site, as Greenpeace activists set up a banner within the lines of one of the geoglyphs, damaging the site. Greenpeace issued an apology following the incident, though one of the activists was convicted and fined for their part in causing damage.

The Greenpeace incident also directed attention to other damage to geoglyphs outside of the World Heritage area caused in 2012 and 2013 by off-road vehicles of the Dakar Rally, which is visible from satellite imagery.

In January 2018, an errant truck driver was arrested but later released for lack of evidence indicating any intent other than a simple error. He had damaged three of the geoglyphs by leaving substantial tire marks across an area of approximately 46 m by 107 m (150 by 350 feet).

In 2025, the Ministry of Culture ordered a 42% reduction in the land area of the Nazca lines reserve from about 5,600 square kilometers to roughly 3,200 square kilometers, citing updated archeological studies. The reduction was criticized amid concerns over informal mining in the area and led to the ministry reversing its decision shortly afterwards.

== Palpa glyphs ==
The Paracas culture is considered by some historians to be the possible precursor that influenced the development of the Nazca Lines. In 2018, drones used by archaeologists revealed 25 geoglyphs in the Palpa province that are being assigned to the Paracas culture. Many predate the associated Nazca lines by a thousand years. Some demonstrate a significant difference in the subjects and locations, such as some being on hillsides. Their co-discoverer, Peruvian archaeologist Luis Jaime Castillo Butters, indicates that many of these newly discovered geoglyphs represent warriors. The Paracas is the same group that some believe created the well-known geoglyph known as the Paracas Candelabra.

== Chinchas glyphs ==
Farther north from the Nazca, Palpas region and along the Peruvian coast are other glyphs from the Chincha culture that have also been discovered.

== Images ==
The following are images of some of the Nazca lines.

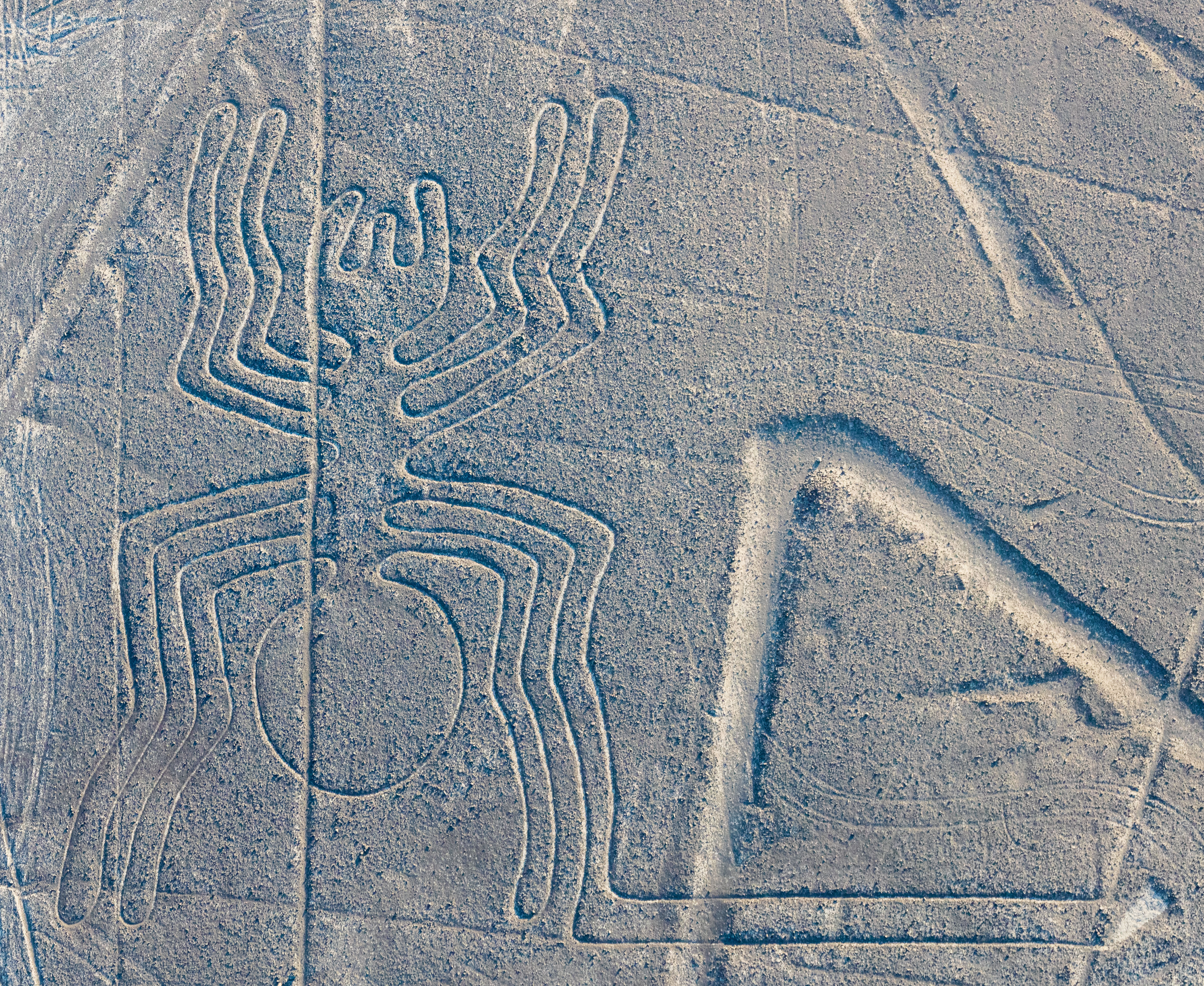
The Spider (la Araña)

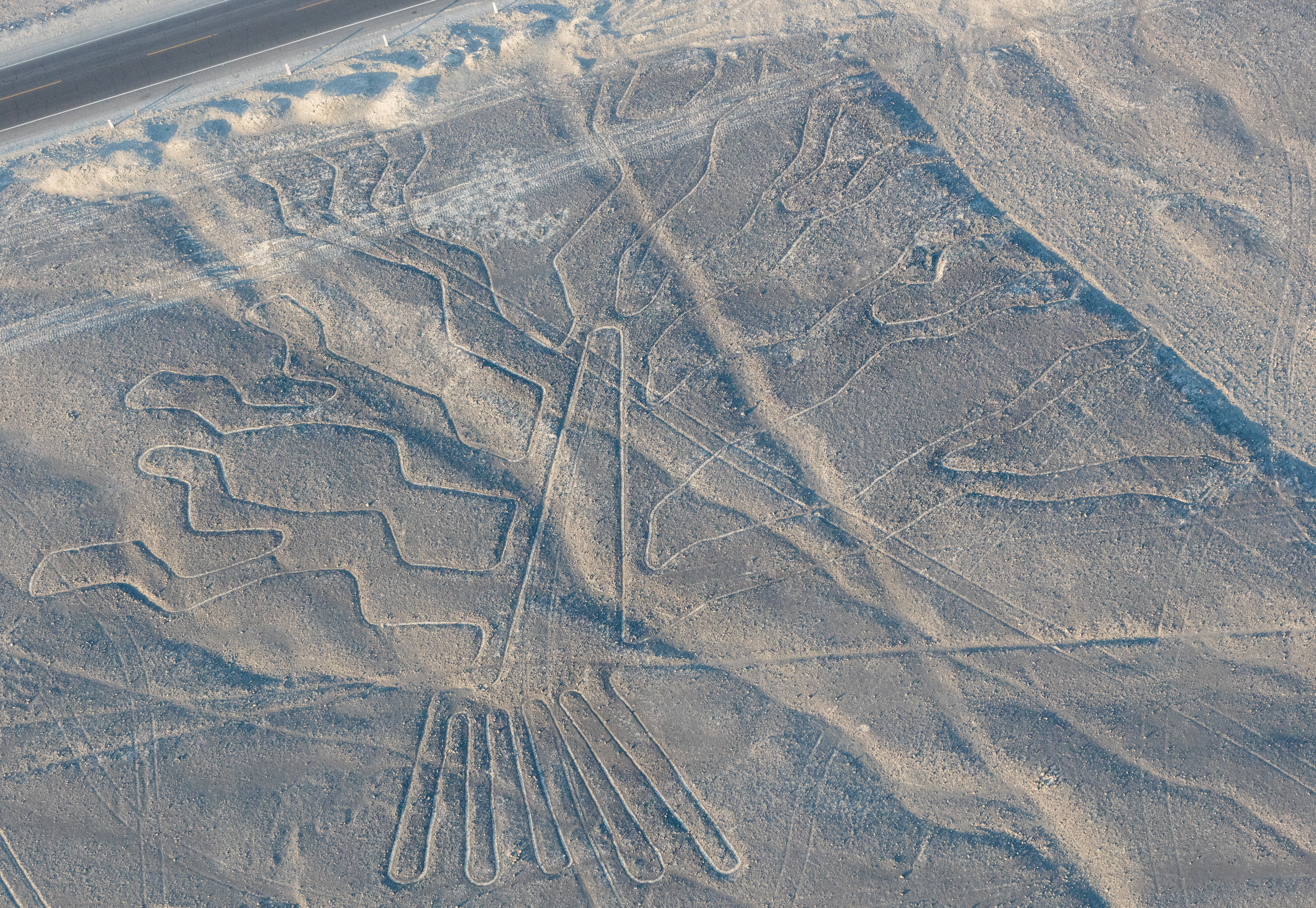
The Tree (el árbol)

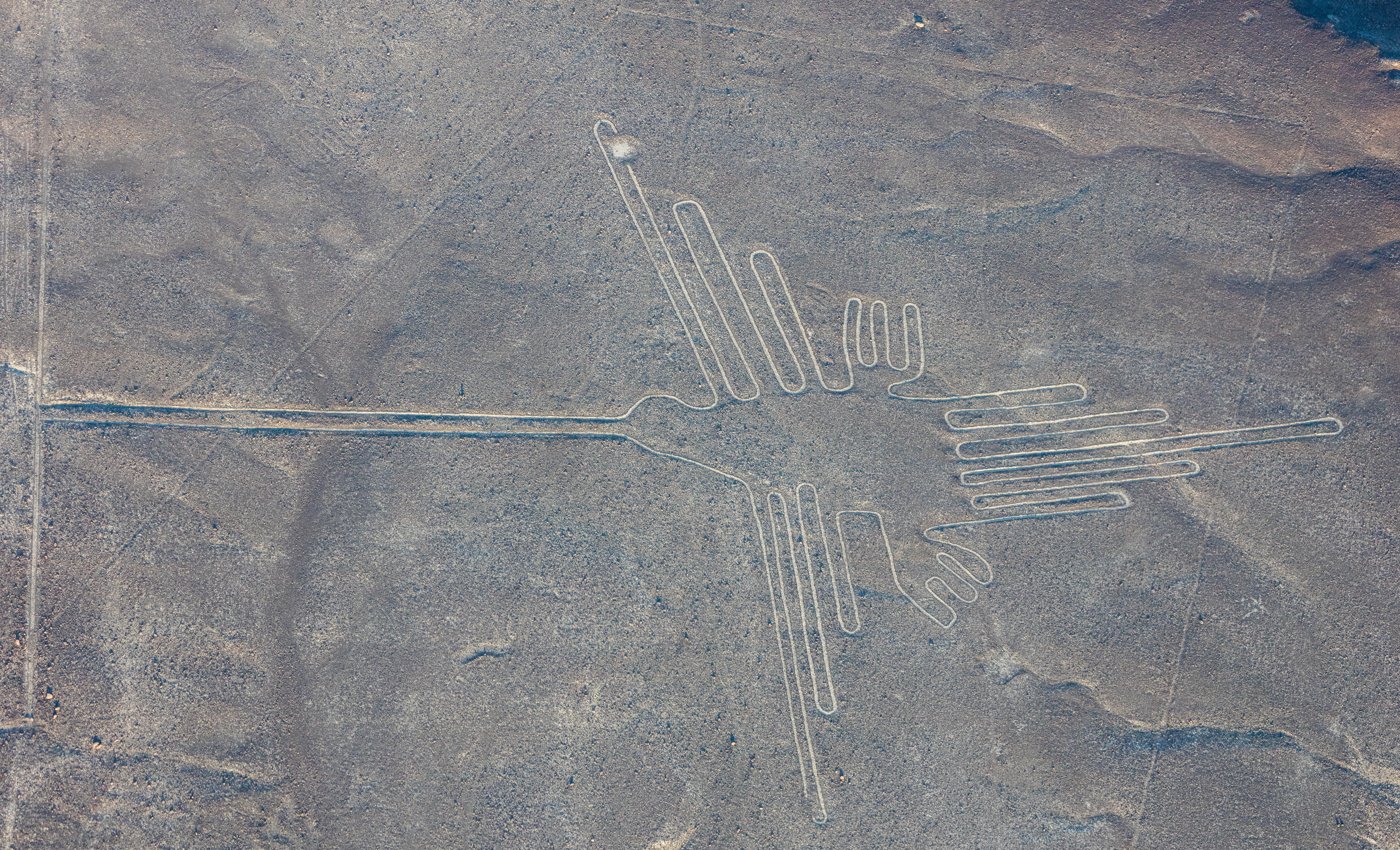
The Hummingbird (el colibrí)

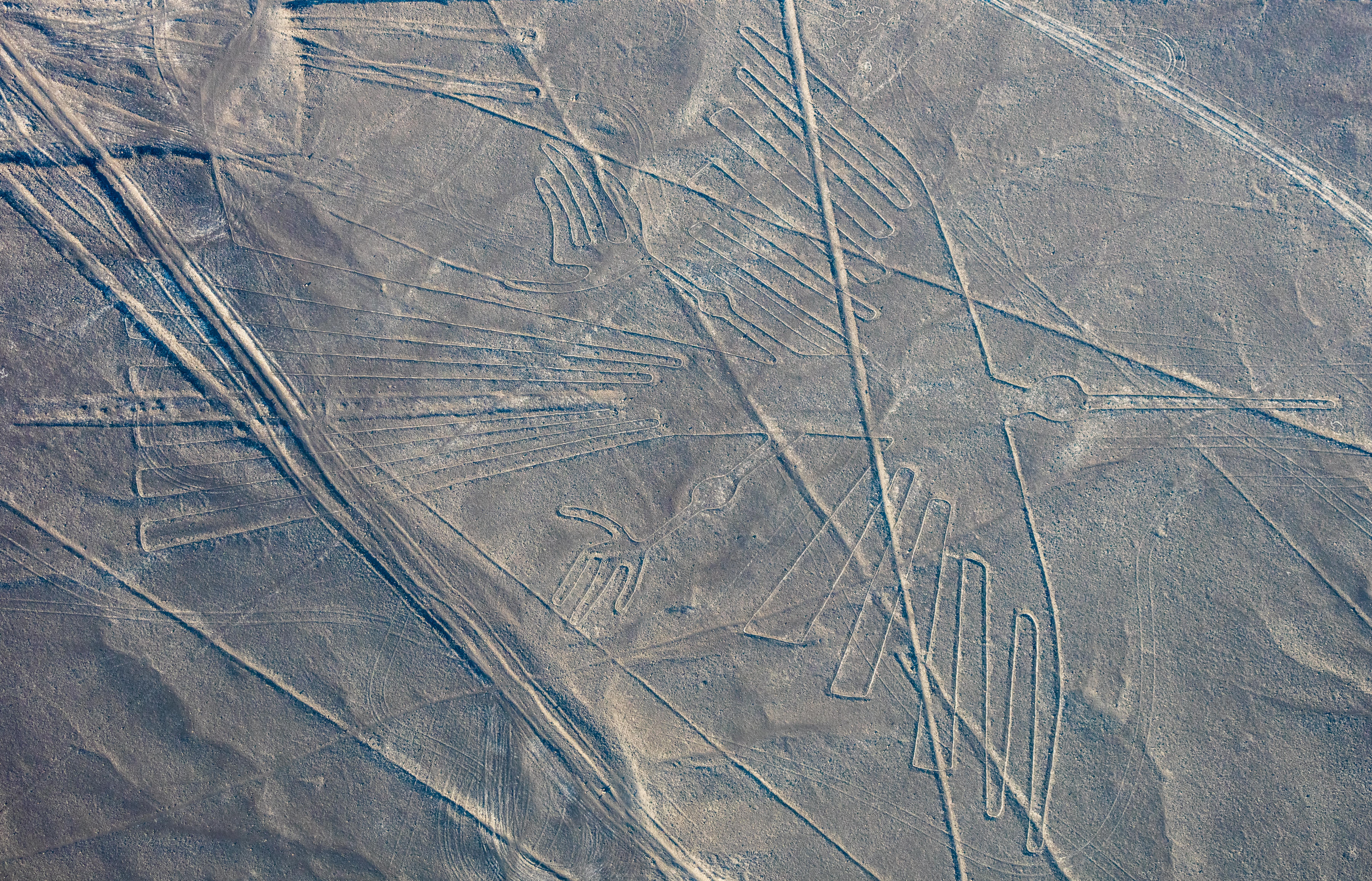
The Condor (el cóndor)

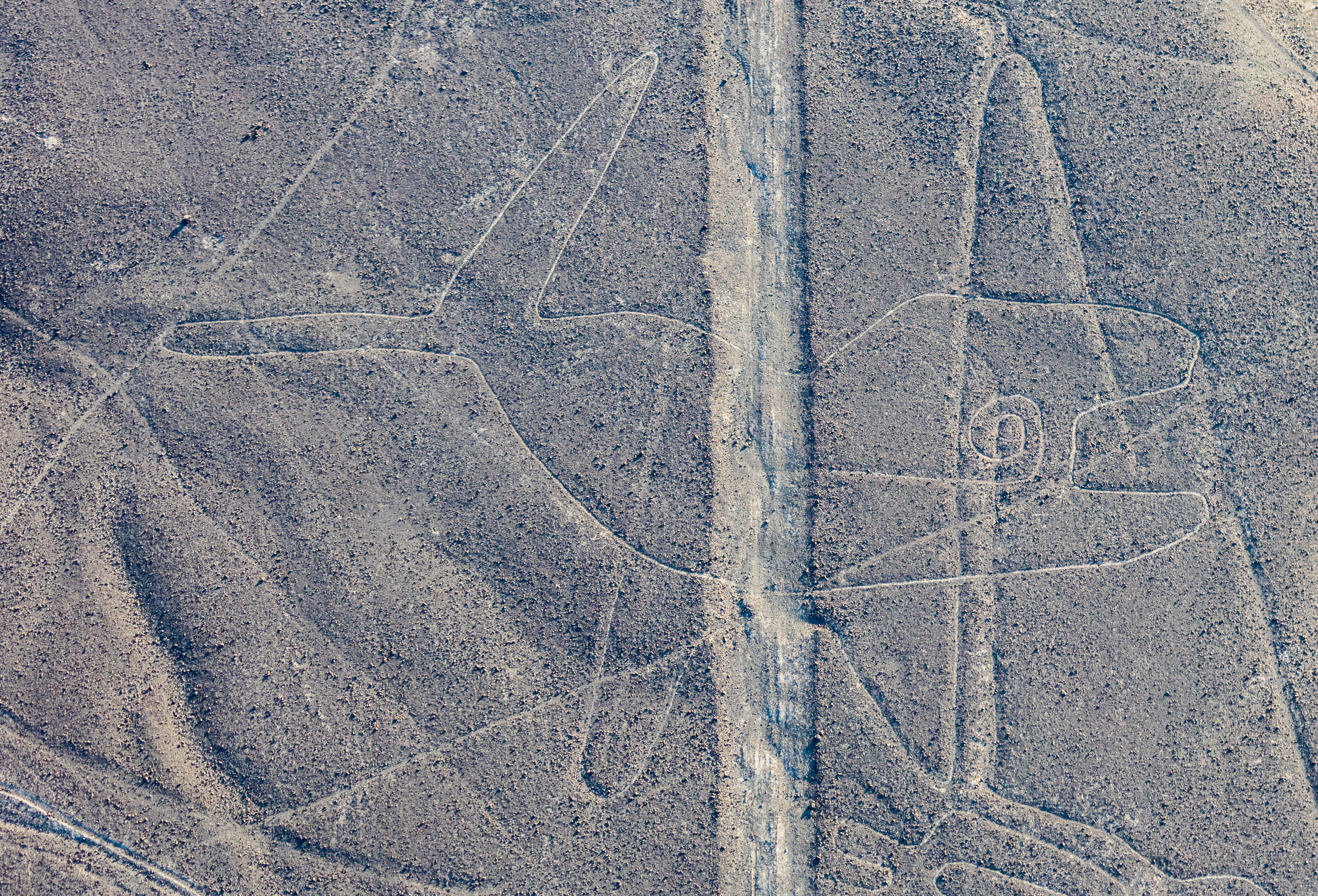
The Whale (la ballena)

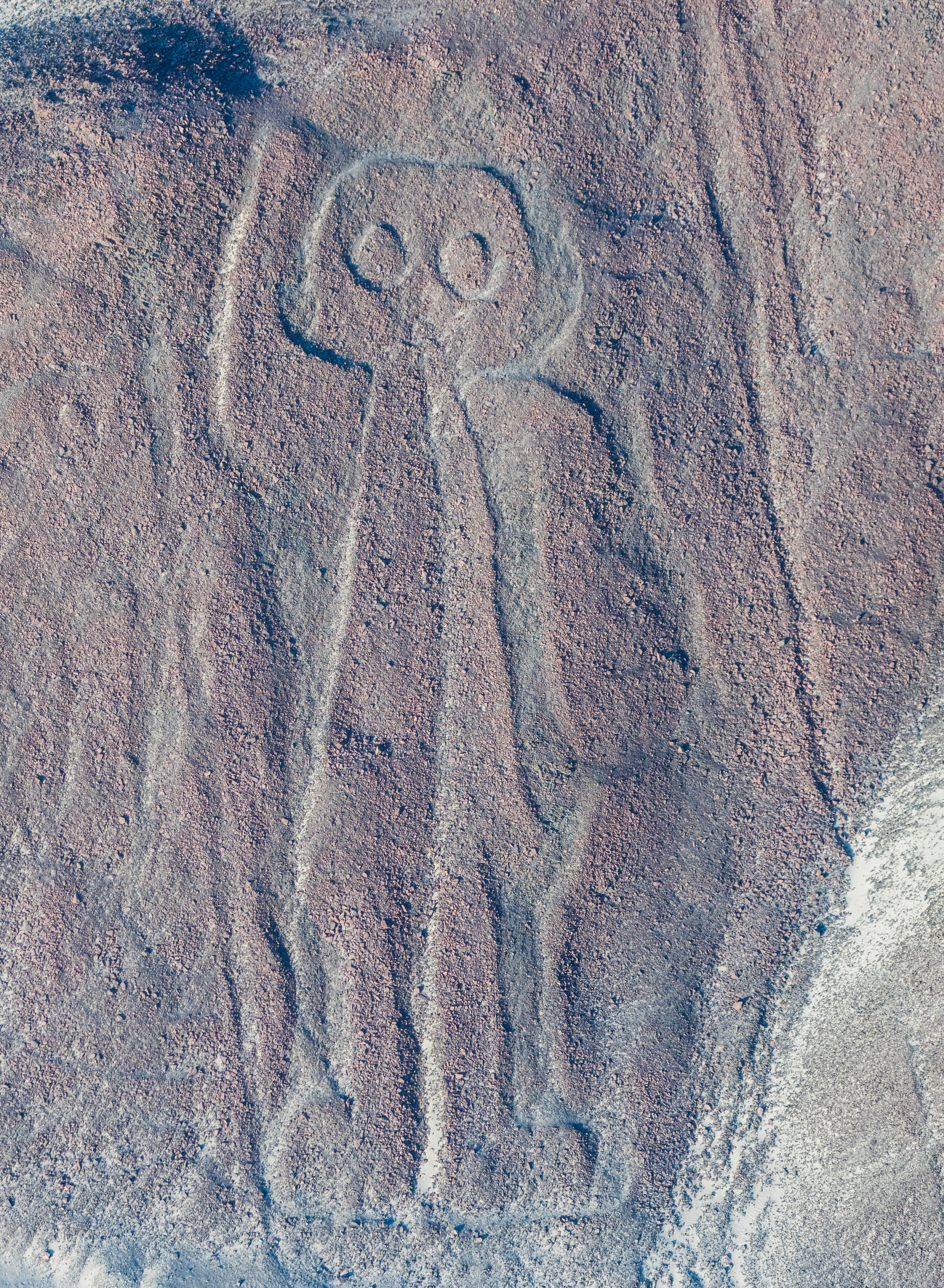
The Astronaut (el astronauta)

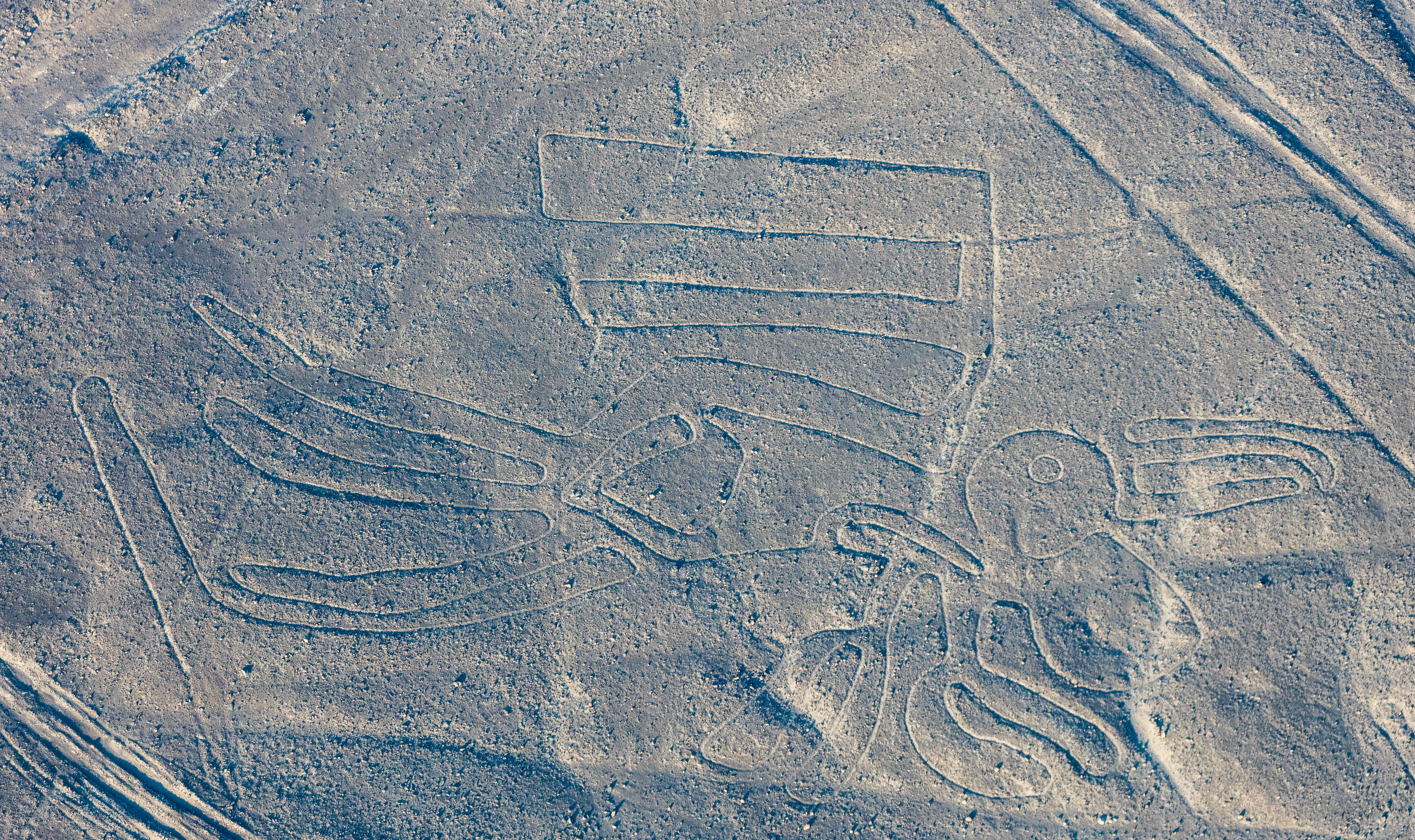
The Pelican

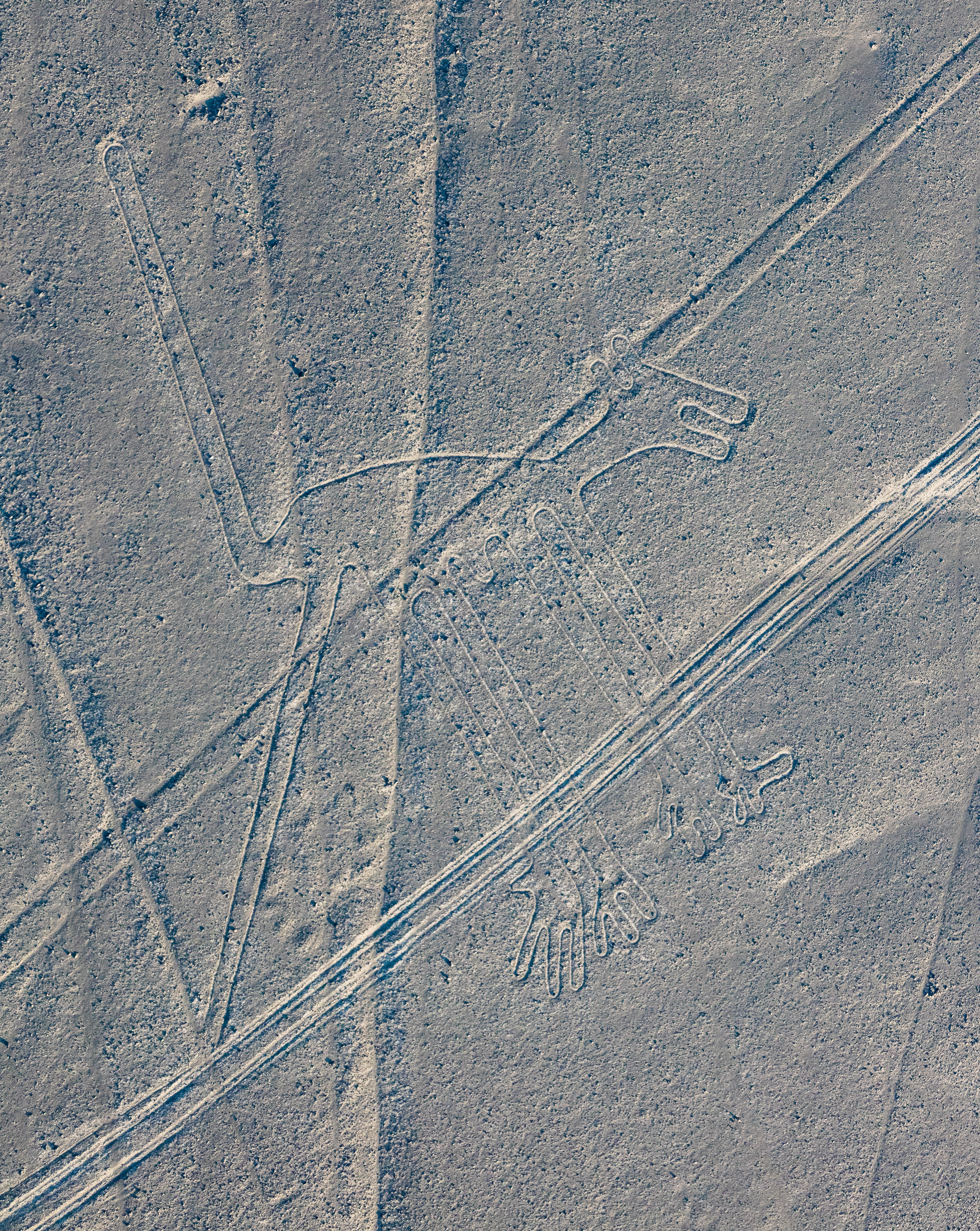
The Dog (el perro)

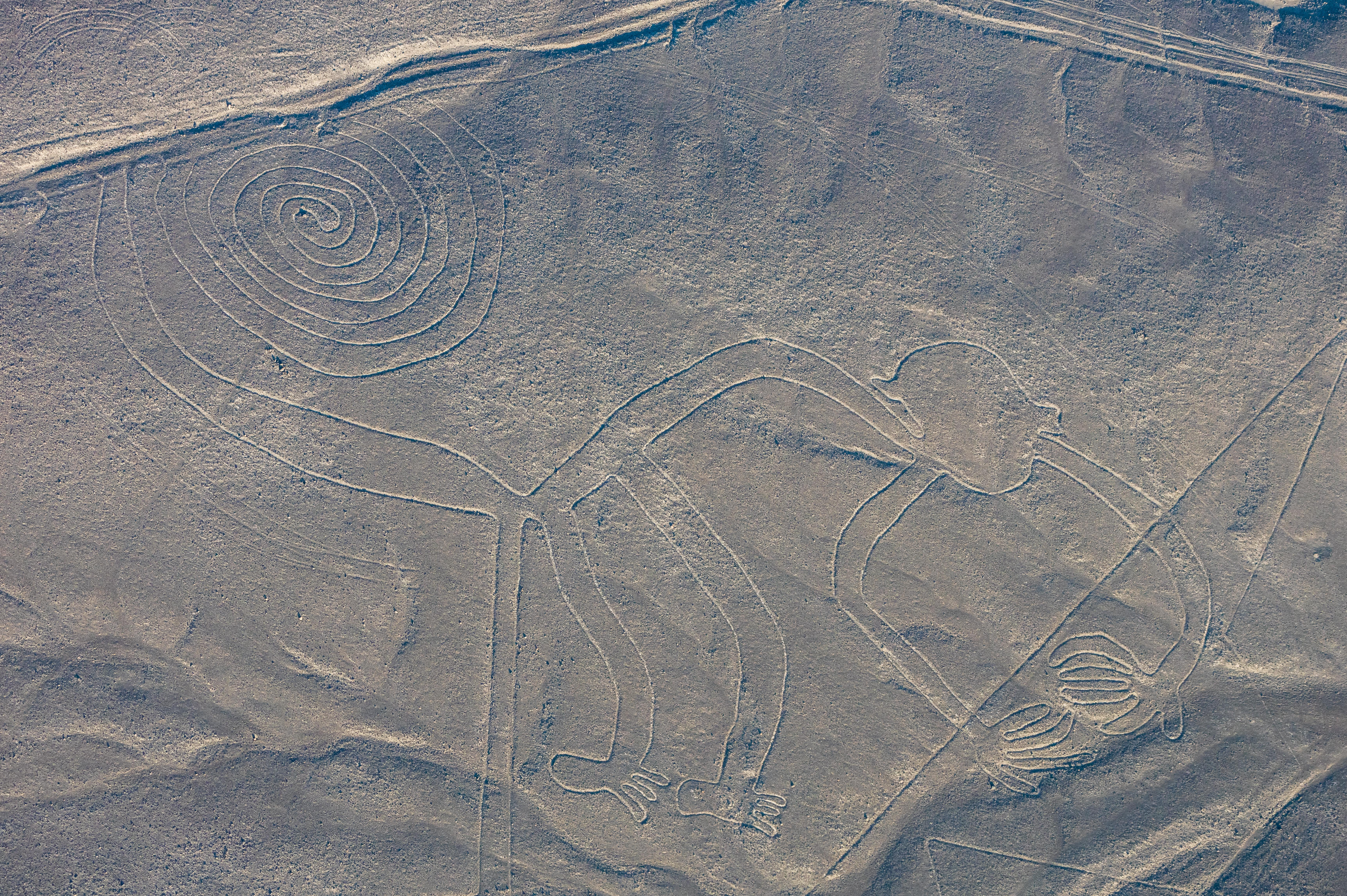
The Monkey (el mono)

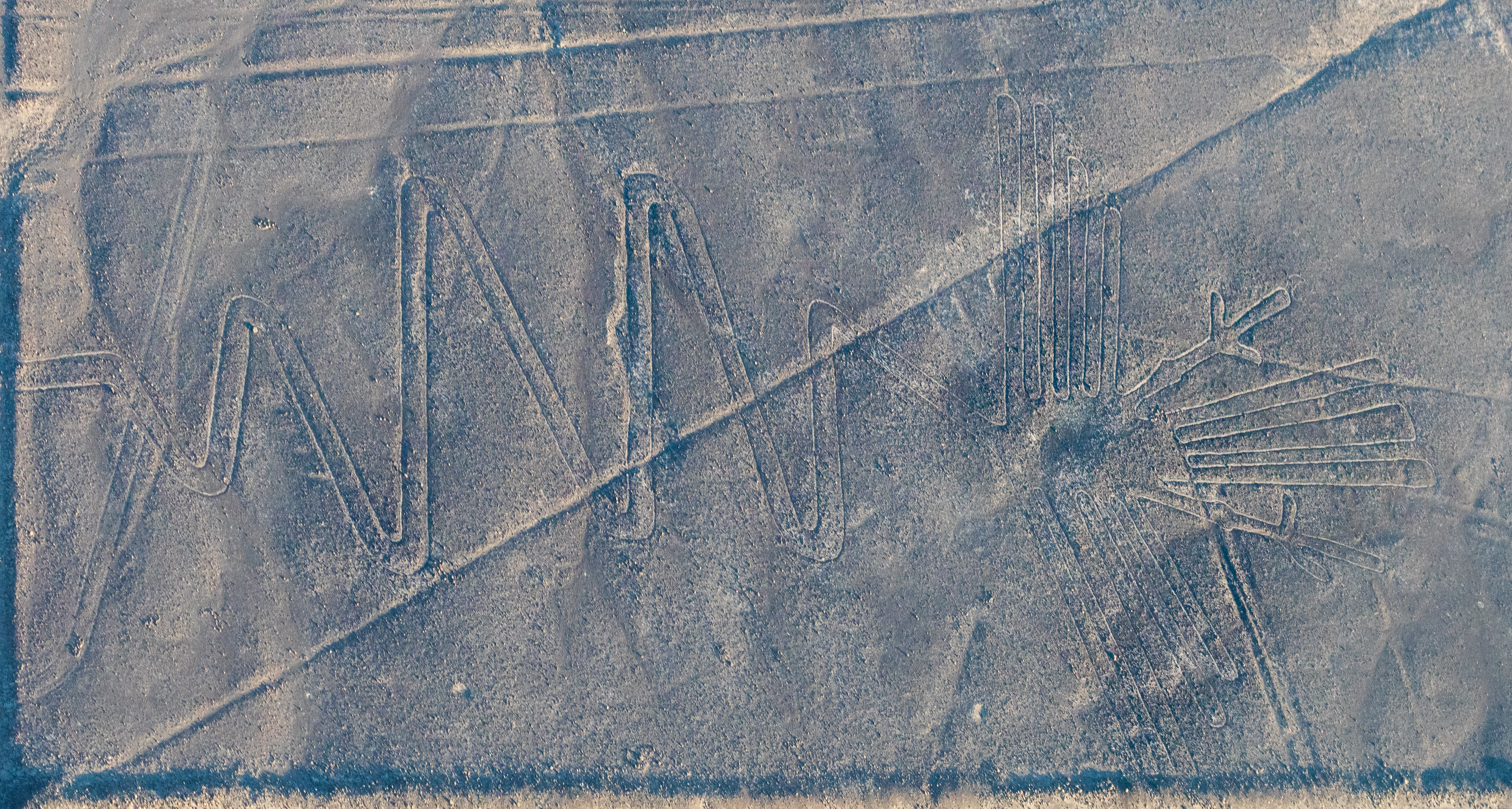
The Heron (la garza)

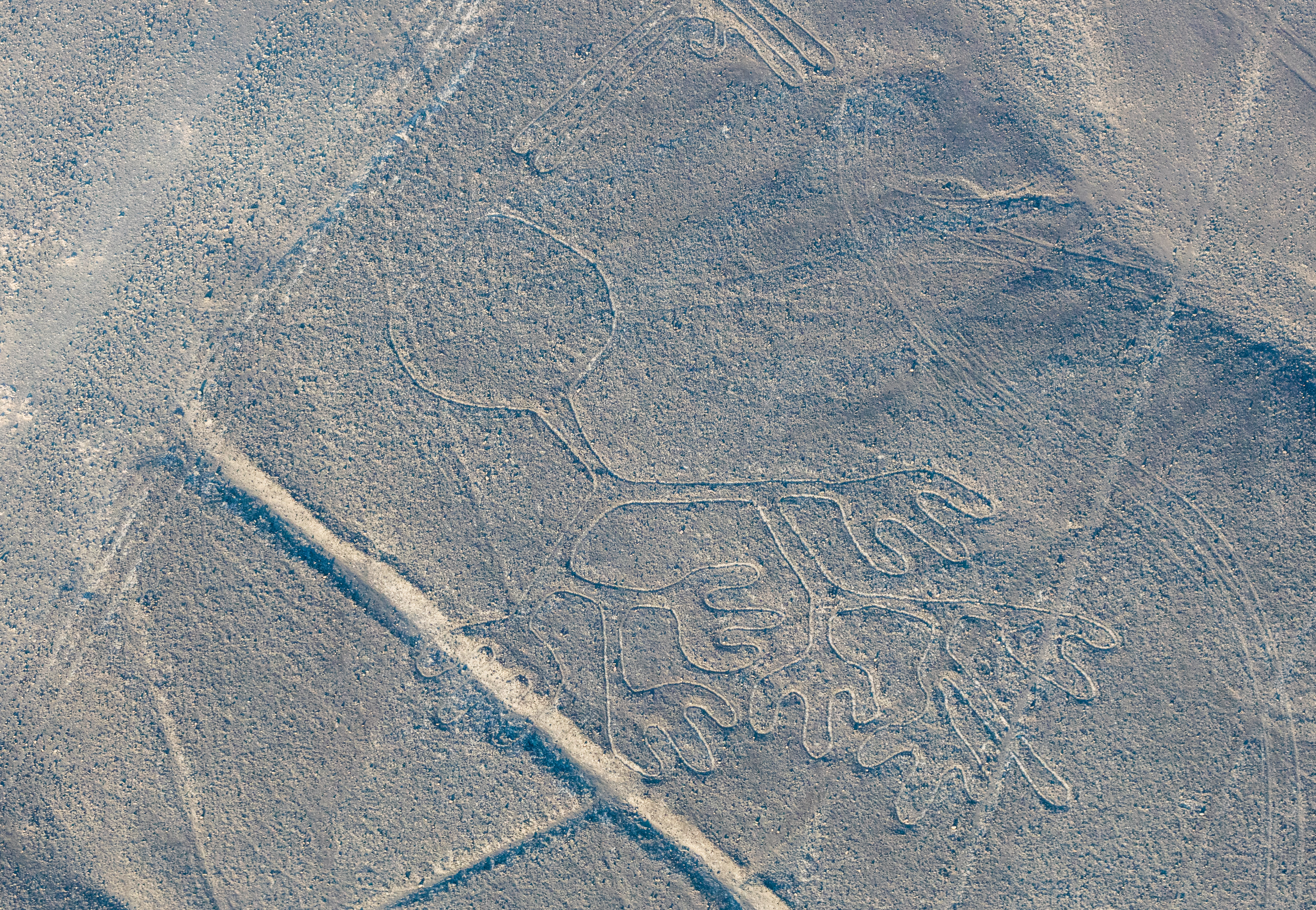
Phytomorphic glyphs

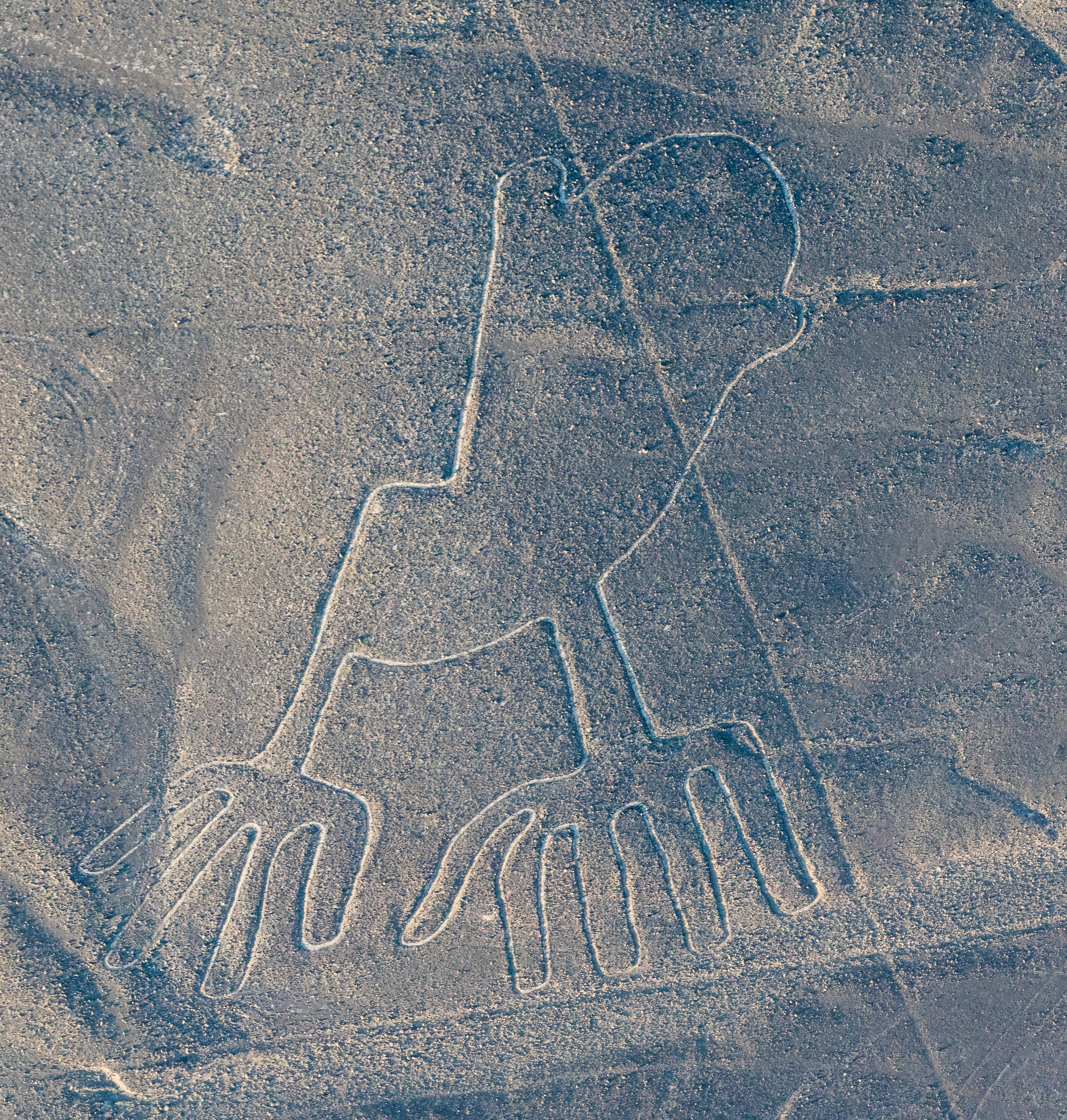
The Hands (las manos)

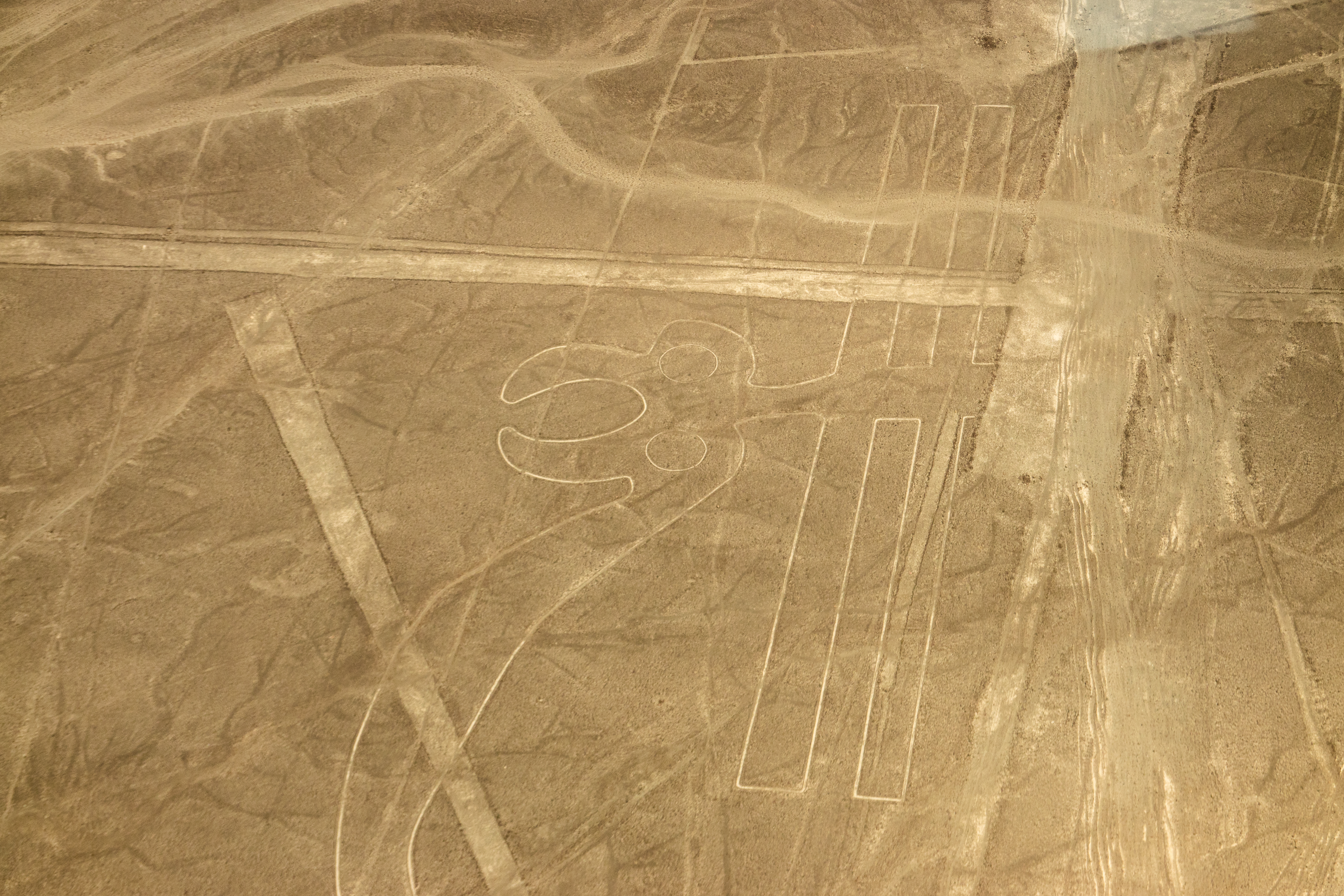
The Parrot (el loro)

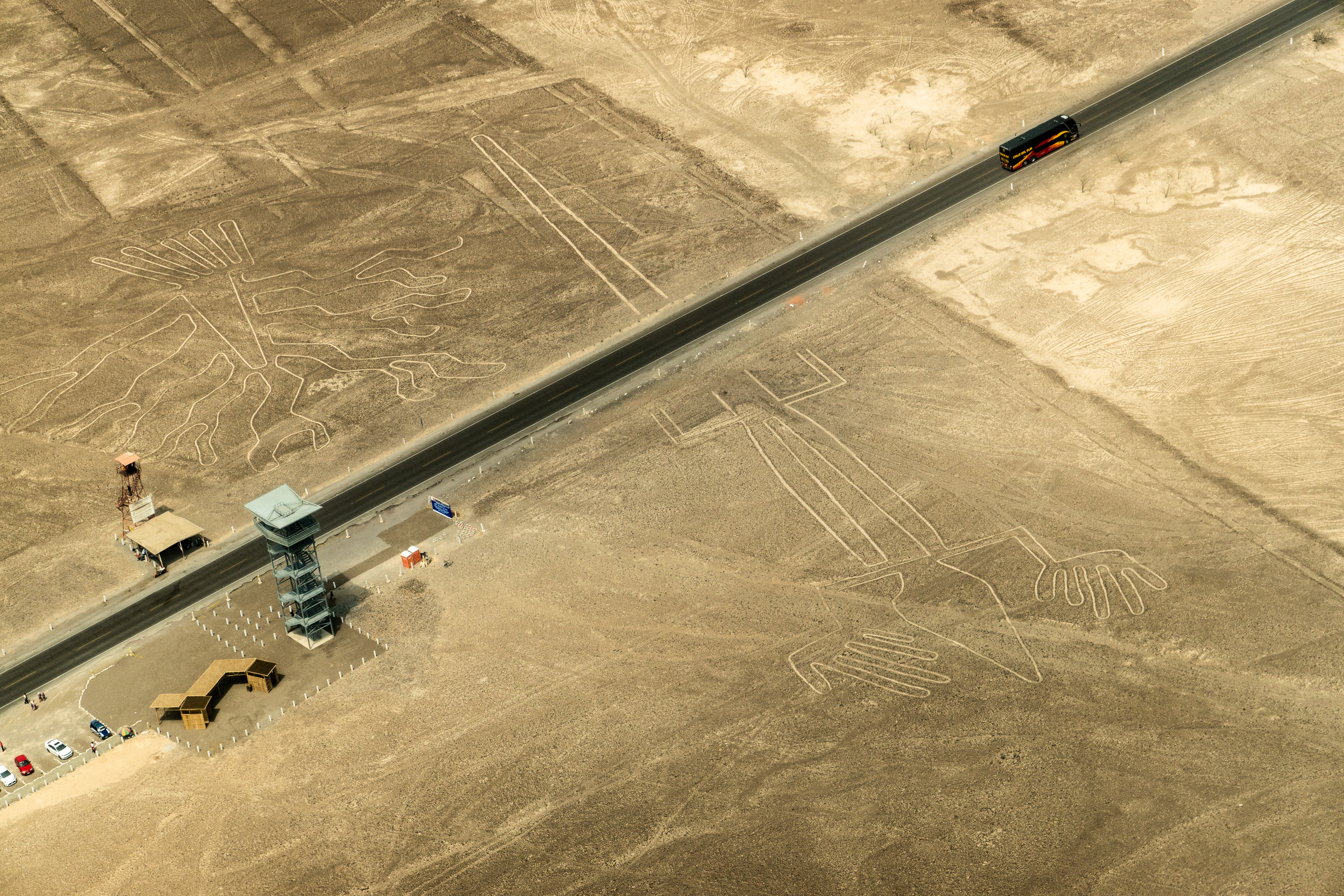
The Lizard (la lagartija)

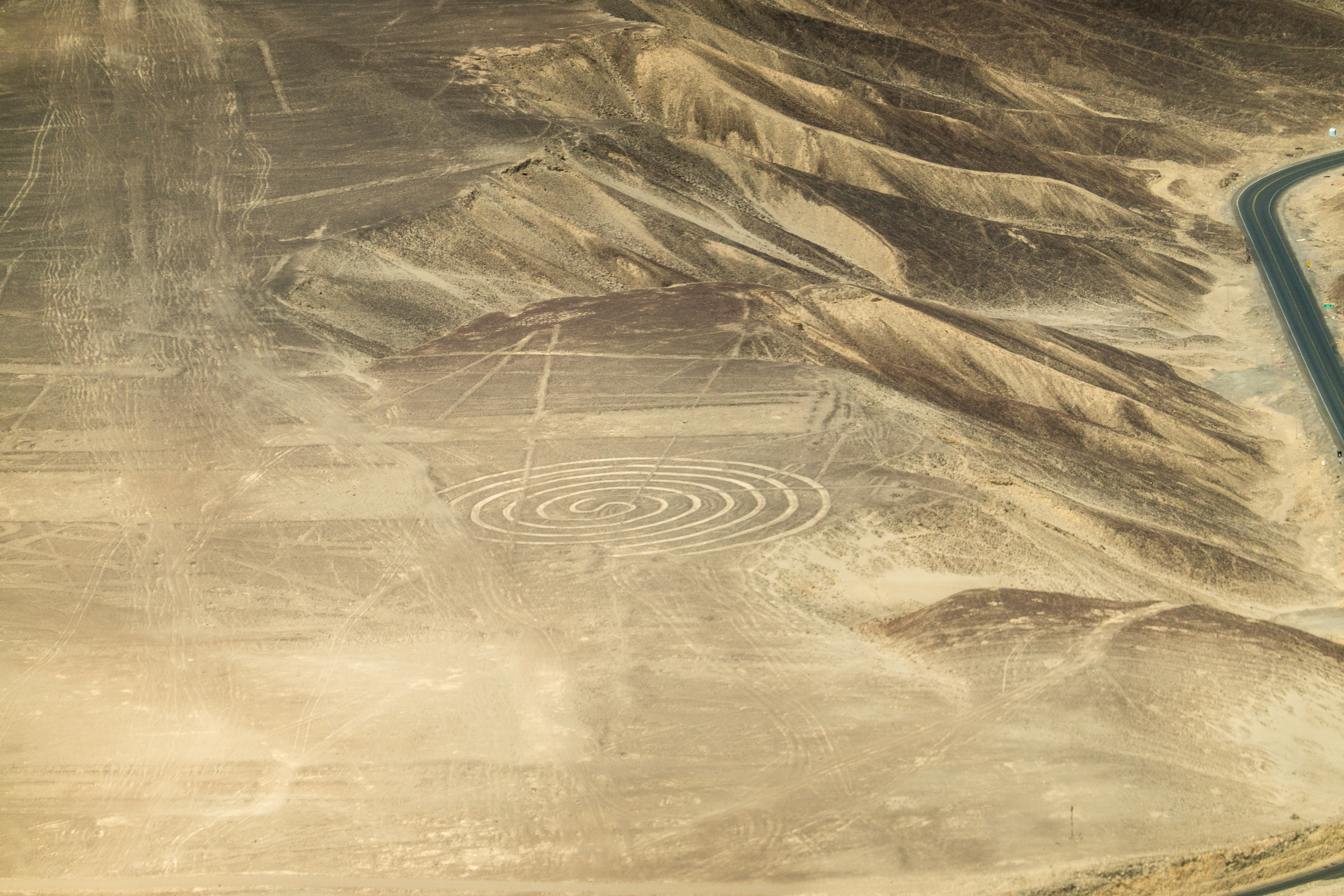
The Snail (el caracol) or The Spiral (el espiral)

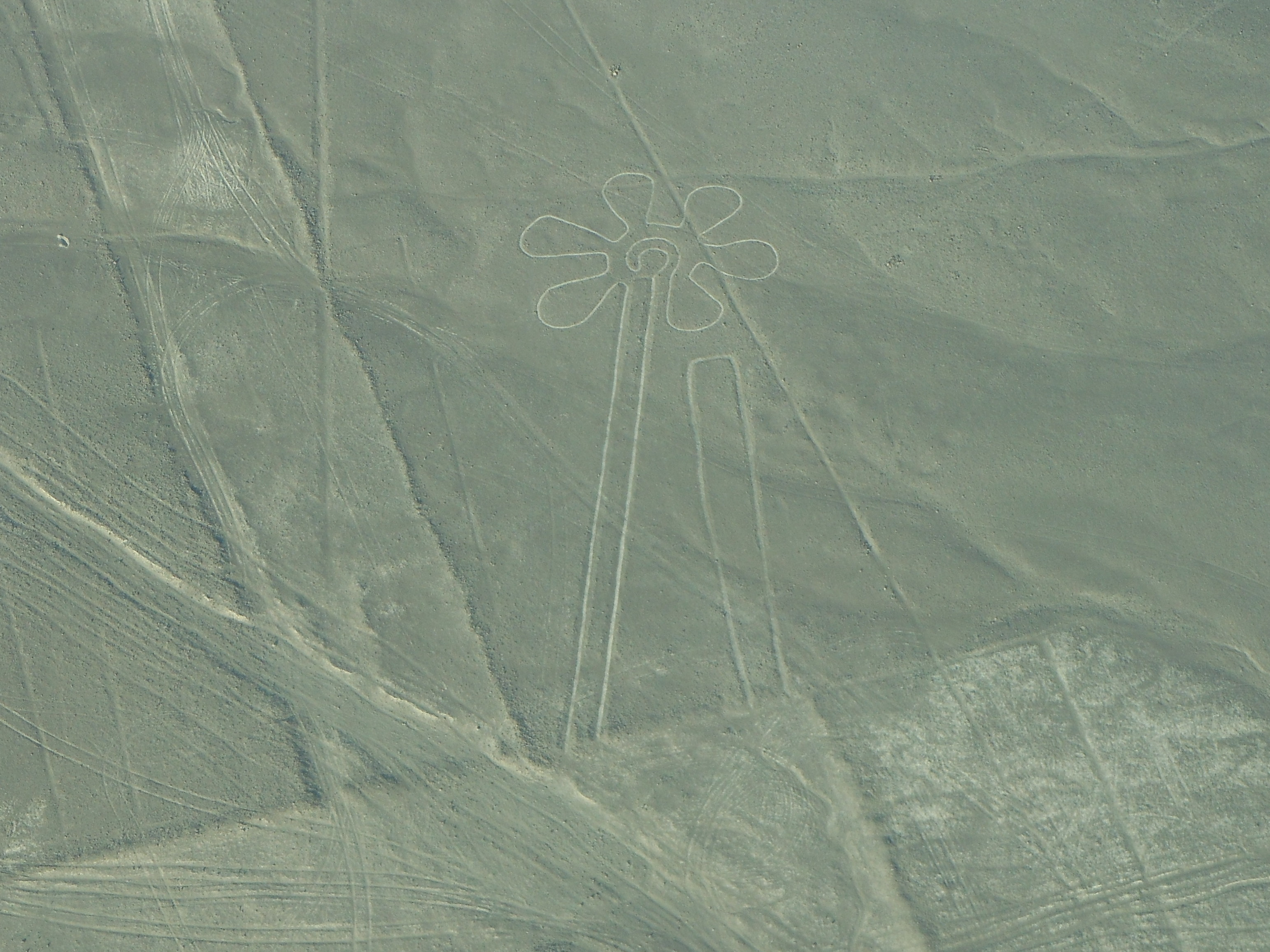
The Flower (la flor)

== See also ==
- Atacama Giant – Geoglyph in the Atacama Desert, Chile
- Band of Holes – Archaeological site in Peru
- Blythe Intaglios – Group of incised ground figures in California, US
- Celestial mechanics – Branch of astronomy
- Cerne Abbas Giant – Hill figure near Cerne Abbas in Dorset
- Geoglyph – Motif produced on the ground; observable only from a height
- History of Peru
- Iperú – Government agency of Peru

- Kofun – Megalithic tombs in Northeast Asia
- List of archaeoastronomical sites by country
- Marilyn Bridges – American photographer
- Megalith – Large stone used to build a structure or monument
- Paracas Candelabra – Prehistoric geoglyph in Peru
- Simone Waisbard – French explorer
- Tourism in Peru
- Uffington White Horse – Prehistoric carving in Uffington, England
