= Paracas Candelabra =

Prehistoric geoglyph in Peru

Coordinates: 13°47′40.5″S 76°18′31.31″W

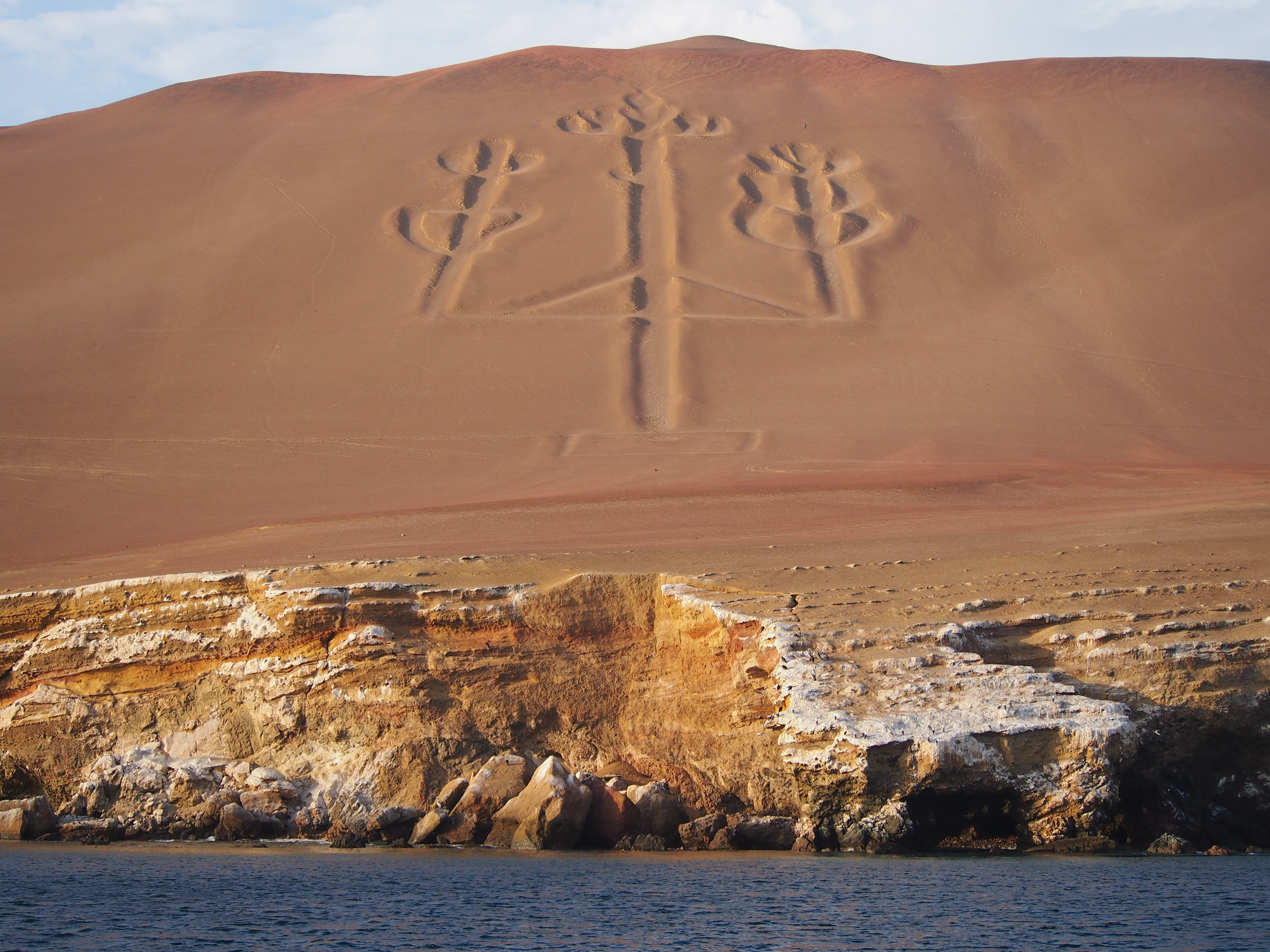
Paracas Candelabra

The Paracas Candelabra, also called the Candelabra of the Andes, El Candelabro, Tridente (Trident) or Tres cruces (Three Crosses), is a well-known prehistoric geoglyph found on the northern face of the Paracas Peninsula at Pisco Bay in Peru. Pottery found nearby has been radio carbon dated to 200 BCE, the time of the Paracas culture. The design is cut 60 cm (2 ft) into the soil, with stones possibly from a later date placed around it. The figure is 170 m (560 ft) tall and 60 m (200 ft) wide, large enough to be seen 19 km (12 mi) at sea.

In 2016, it was designated as a national heritage site by Peru, with Peruvian law dictating a jail term of between three and six years for anyone damaging any archaeological monument.

When the Peruvian archaeologist Maria Reiche measured the geoglyph, she found broken pieces of Paracas-style pottery there which she dated to around 200 BCE. The geoglyph is related to the Nazca lines.

== See also ==
- Atacama Giant – Geoglyph in the Atacama Desert, Chile
- Nazca lines – Geoglyphs in the Nazca Desert, Peru
