= Toribio Mejía Xesspe =

Peruvian archaeologist

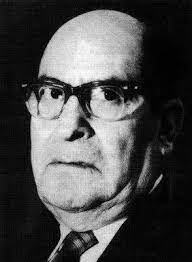
- Born: April 16, 1896; Toro District, Peru
- Died: November 2, 1983 (aged 87); Lima, Peru
- Education: National University of San Marcos
- Occupations: Anthropologist and Archeologist

Manuel Toribio Mejía Xesspe (April 16, 1896 – November 2, 1983) was a Peruvian archaeologist and student of Julio César Tello. He discovered the Nazca Lines in 1926 or 1927.

== Biography ==
Mejía Xesspe was born in Toro, a district of the La Unión province, Arequipa department.

Reports differ on the specific year, but in either 1926 or 1927 Mejía Xesspe discovered locations of the Nazca Lines while hiking in the foothills of the surrounding area. He then discussed them at a conference in Lima in 1939.

Mejía Xesspe died in Lima, due to a congenital disease of the spleen.

== See also ==
- Nazca culture
