= Atacama Giant =

Geoglyph in the Atacama Desert, Chile

Coordinates: 19°56′56″S 69°37′59″W

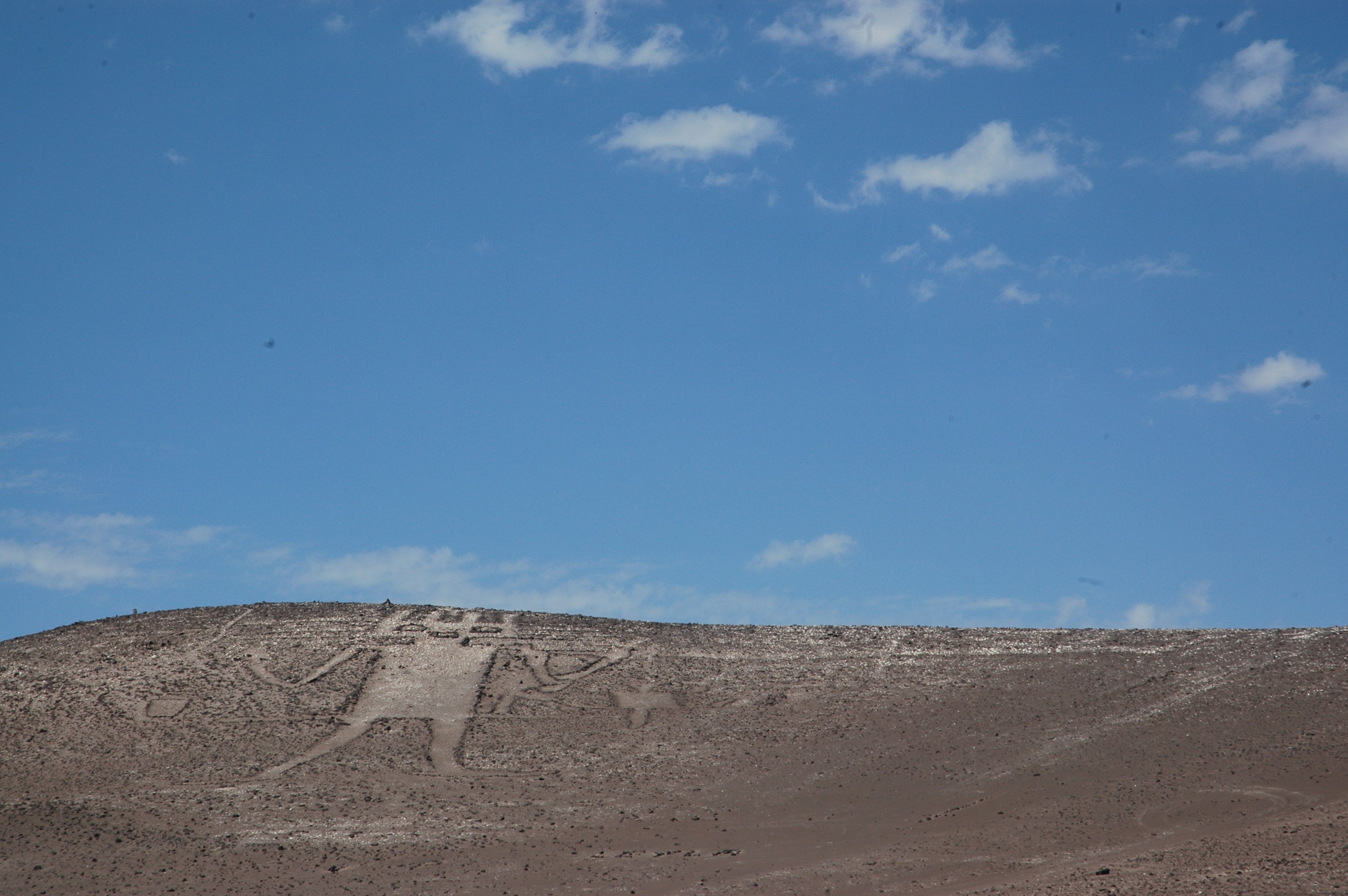
The Atacama Giant.

The Atacama Giant (Spanish: Gigante de Atacama) is an anthropomorphic geoglyph on the Cerro Unita area of the Atacama Desert, Chile. At about 119 meters (390 feet), is the largest prehispanic anthropomorphic geoglyph. It has been suggested that it represents a shaman, spiritual figure or deity.

Atacama Giant, vectorized drawing

The Atacama Giant is one out of nearly 5,000 geoglyphs (ancient artwork that is drawn into the landscape) that have been discovered in the Atacama region in the last three decades. It is believed that they are the work of several successive cultures that dwelt in this region of South America, including the Tiwanaku and Inca. The Atacama Giant was built some time between 1000 and 1400 CE. One suggested explanation for the figure's features and function is that the alignment of the points on the top and side of the head with the moon helped to determine the season, which was useful since knowing when the rainy season would come was crucial in the barren desert.

== See also ==
- Geoglyph – Motif produced on the ground; observable only from a height
- Nazca lines – Geoglyphs in the Nazca Desert, Peru
- Paracas Candelabra – Prehistoric geoglyph in Peru
