= Simone Waisbard =

French explorer

- Notable work: Tiahuanaco; Les Pistes de Nazca

Simone Waisbard (born 30 August 1909) was a French explorer who spent years in South and Central America, studying remnants of the many ancient civilizations and tribes that have lived there. She is the author of several books: Tiahuanaco, Les Pistes de Nazca and (with Roger Waisbard, translated by Patricia Russell), Masks, Mummies, and Magicians: A Voyage of Exploration in Pre-Inca Peru.
