= Manuel Hipólito Orella =

Chilean naval officer (died 1857)

- Born: Unknown; Captaincy General of Chile, Spanish Monarchy
- Died: February 12, 1857; Quillota, Chile
- Military career
- Allegiance: Chile
- Branch: Chilean Navy; Chilean Army
- Service years: 1818–1830; 1839–1857
- Rank: Frigate captain (navy); Sergeant major (army)
- Conflicts: Spanish American wars of independence; Chilean War of Independence; Peruvian War of Independence
- Awards: Medal for Maipú (1818); Silver medal for Valdivia (1820); Medal for the liberating expedition of Peru; Chiloé campaign medal (1826)

Agustín Manuel Hipólito Orella Macaya (died Quillota, Chile, 12 February 1857), known simply as Manuel Hipólito Orella, was a Chilean naval officer who made a career in the Chilean Navy. He was one of the first Chilean midshipmen who entered the nascent navy in 1818. He joined the First Chilean Navy Squadron and participated in the naval war for the independence of Chile and Peru. Likewise, also spent time in the Chilean Army in the infantry branch. Furthermore, he held several important positions in the navy until his death in 1857.

== Early years and emancipation war ==
Orella was born somewhere in the Captaincy General of Chile, part of the Spanish Monarchy. His father was Manuel de Orella Goya and his mother Mercedes Macaya Mujica. He had a sister named Maria del Carmen.

In the first months of 1818 he entered the Military Academy of Santiago as a cadet and was soon sent to fight in the battle of Maipú in April, winning a medal for it. At the beginning of September, entered the newly created Naval Academy of Valparaíso as a midshipman. Orella was one of the thirteen cadets of the Military Academy who, at the request of Supreme Director Bernardo O'Higgins, were chosen by the ship-of-the-line captain Manuel Blanco Encalada to be the first students of the naval institution. He would be one of the few first midshipmen to continue the naval career.

== In the first Chilean naval squadron during the war ==
=== Campaigns between 1818 and 1822 ===
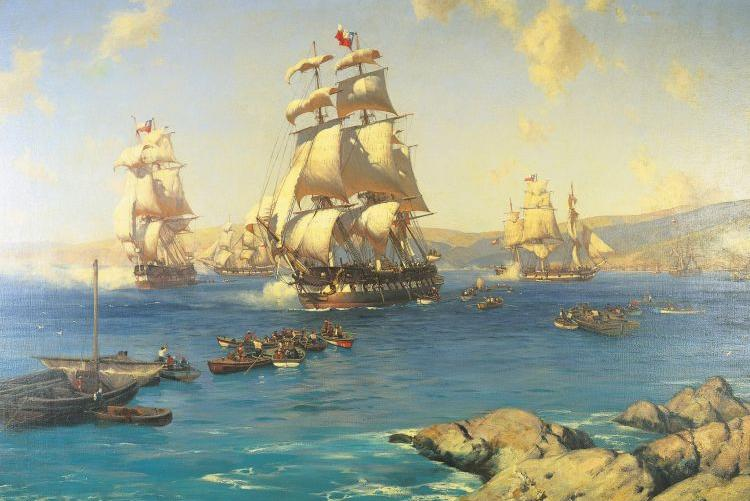
Departure of the First National Squadron (1910), oil painting by Thomas Somerscales (1842–1927)

At the end of September, embarked on the corvette Chacabuco, under the command of Captain Francisco Díaz, and joined the fleet commanded by Blanco Encalada, which sailed from Valparaíso on 9 October with the mission of intercepting in Talcahuano a Spanish convoy that had recently left Cádiz. His naval baptism by fire culminated in November with the capture of the Spanish frigate María Isabel, renamed O'Higgins, and five transport ships. Upon returning from the mission, he won with the crew the right to wear a bracelet that had the following description: “His first trial gave Chile the dominance of the Pacific”.

On 23 December, he went on to serve under Vice Admiral Thomas Cochrane, hired by the Chilean government to direct his naval fleet. Participated in the two raids to Peru that Cochrane made in 1819, aboard the flagship O'Higgins, under the command of Captain Robert Forster. In these incursions he was present in the capture of San Lorenzo Island, the attacks on Callao, the landings in the Peruvian coast and in the capture of the Spanish ships Águila and Begoña. He also participated in the capture of Valdivia in February 1820, temporarily aboard the schooner Moctezuma, earning a silver medal for his bravery.

He later participated in the Liberating Expedition of Peru, again aboard the O'Higgins, earning another medal. He was in several actions of the expedition, such as the capture of the Spanish frigate Esmeralda, in which he had to command one of the frigate's boats that Cochrane arranged for the attack.

=== Commissions and new campaigns between 1823 and 1826 ===
At the beginning of 1823 Orella became second lieutenant and embarked on the brig Galvarino, under the command of Captain Matías Godomar. The following year served as an assistant to Captain Carlos García del Postigo, appointed Major of the Department of the Navy. On 15 August, ascended to first lieutenant and embarked as an assistant in the frigate Maria Isabel (former O'Higgins), commanded by Captain Forster, and flagship of Vice Admiral Blanco Encalada.

He participated in the campaigns that the Supreme Director Ramón Freire carried out in Peru and Chiloé, which tested his conditions as brave and skillful leader of forces. During the Chiloé campaign of 1826, found himself in the landing maneuver in front of the batteries of San Carlos de Ancud, in which he commanded one of the boats that captured three realistic gunboats protected in the bay and destroyed two others. Days later, repeated the attack in the battle of the Pudeto River. At the end of the campaign, for his military actions, he was promoted to a corvette captain and received a medal that on his obverse had the motto: “Colmavit gloriam suam in Chiloé”.

== Later years ==
Between 1826 and 1827 he was deputy for Quillota. By then, the war against the Spanish Monarchy ended, and the Chilean squadron was disarmed for economic reasons. He went on to serve in the Chilean Army on 8 August 1828, having some experience in the institution; for having been in the Military Academy and for his actions of military landing on the Peruvian coast in 1819. He came to occupy the rank of sergeant major of infantry, being discharged in 1830 and reinstated in 1839 due to the War of the Confederation.

In 1843, he was appointed Captain of the Port of Copiapó, already reintegrated in the navy with the rank of graduate frigate captain. In that period he married Avelina Echanez and later moved with her to the newly created port of Caldera, a new port captaincy in replacement of Copiapó. On 2 October 1847, served as an assistant to the General Commander of the Navy and the following year, without prejudice to his position, assumed the Maritime Government of Valparaíso. Between 1851 and 1852 he was assigned to the Arsenals Command, being already an effective frigate captain. In 1852, his son Manuel Joaquín Orella Echánez was born in Caldera, who would also follow the naval career. He also had two daughters: Celmira and Celia.

On 23 December 1853 he was granted sick leave. Its last designations were the Maritime Government of Atacama (Caldera) in 1854 and that of Valparaíso in 1856. At that time, its service sheet recorded multiple recommendations, one of which read as follows:

(Translation to English) “During the years he was in service this officer has observed a conduct worthy of all praise, having conducted himself with courage, fearlessness, zeal and activity in the performance of his duties”.	(Original in Spanish) “Durante los años que estuvo en servicio este oficial ha observado una conducta digna de todo elogio, habiéndose conducido con valor, intrepidez, celo y actividad en el desempeño de sus deberes”.

Finally, he died in Quillota, on 12 February 1857. His wife received from the government, by the laws of 30 March of that year and 28 August 1868, respectively, a pension of 543 pesos per year and one of 14 pesos per month.

== Posthumous tribute ==
In 2011, the new buildings of the Maritime Governorate of Caldera bear his name in memory of this illustrious naval officer, who was his first naval governor after the founding of Caldera in 1850.

== Sources ==
- Merlet Sanhueza, Enrique (2013). La Escuela Naval de Chile: Historia, tradición y promociones (PDF) (in Spanish) (2 ed.). Valparaíso, Chile: Imprenta de la Armada.
