= Capture of the frigate Esmeralda =

- Part of the Peruvian War of Independence
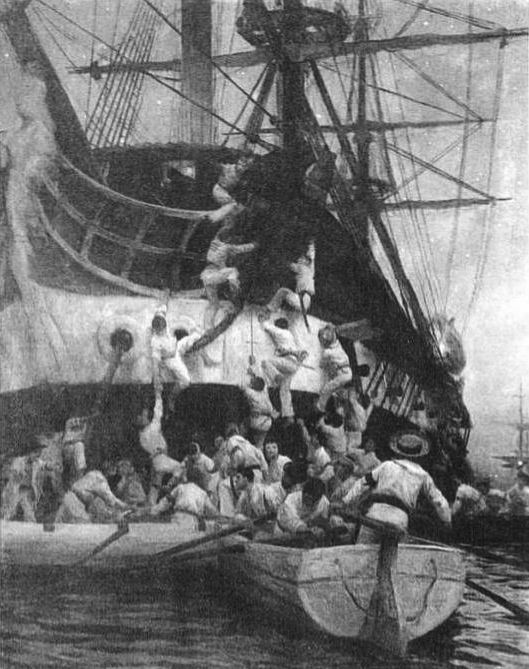
- Capture of the frigate Esmeralda in the bay of Callao, L, Colet, Club Naval, Valparaíso.
Date	5–6 November 1820
Location	Callao, Viceroyalty of Peru
Result	Chilean victory

Belligerents
Chile	Spain

Commanders and leaders
Thomas Cochrane (WIA); Thomas Crosbie; Martin Guise	Antonio Vacaro; Juan Francisco Sánchez; Luis Coig (surrendered)

Strength
240 sailors & marines 14 boats	1 frigate 2 brigs 1 pailebot 14-24 gunboats some armed merchants several harbour batteries

Casualties and losses
11 killed 22 wounded	1 frigate captured 3 gunboats captured

The capture of the frigate Esmeralda was a naval operation conducted on the night of 5 November 1820 during the Peruvian War of Independence. A division of boats with sailors and marines of the First Chilean Navy Squadron, commanded by Thomas Cochrane, stealthily advanced towards Callao and captured the 40-gun Spanish frigate Esmeralda in a cutting-out operation. The frigate was the most powerful Spanish warship in the region and the main objective of the operation. She was protected by a strong military defense that the Royalists had organized in the port.

Both Chilean and Spanish historiography considers that as a result of this naval action the importance or maritime influence of the Spanish Navy in the Pacific disappeared completely. British historians Brian Vale and David J. Cubitt follow the same line of opinion when affirming that Spain had unquestionably lost control of the sea against the Chilean Navy.

== Background ==
On 20 August 1820, the Liberating Expedition commanded by General José de San Martín sailed from Valparaíso to Peru. This force was escorted by the Chilean fleet, (Note: The squadron was formed by the frigate O'Higgins (flagship), ship of the line San Martín, frigate Lautaro, corvette Independencia, the brigs Galvarino, Pueyrredón and Araucano, and schooner Moctezuma.) under the command of Vice Admiral Cochrane.

From the beginning of the campaign, San Martín and Cochrane had differences regarding the military strategy that they should carry out in Peru. The first wanted to avoid direct fighting, win over the population and press with indirect actions towards Lima. The second wanted to give a decisive blow to the Royalists with both army and navy. San Martín's line of thought prevailed.

The expeditionary force arrived on 7 September in Paracas, near Pisco. San Martin established his headquarters to put pressure on the Royalists. The Viceroy Juaquin de la Pezuela entered into negotiations with San Martin, based on the new political situation in the Iberian Peninsula with the proclamation of the Spanish Constitution of 1812. However, the negotiations that took place between the end of September and the beginning of October, failed.

At the beginning of October, San Martin sent a division of the army to the Peruvian highlands to win the territory over for the Patriots, giving the command of this force to General Juan Antonio Álvarez de Arenales.

On 9 October 1820, the garrison of Guayaquil mutinied and proclaimed the independence of the city. This event had material and moral consequences in favor of the revolutionary cause in Peru.

On 26 October, the expeditionary force left Pisco towards the north, arriving on the 29th in front of Callao. The next day, San Martin went to Ancón with the purpose of executing military operations on land. For his part, Cochrane occupied the island of San Lorenzo and stayed at the port's approaches to establish a rigorous blockade with several ships.

== Blockade of Callao ==
=== Inactivity of the Spanish Navy ===
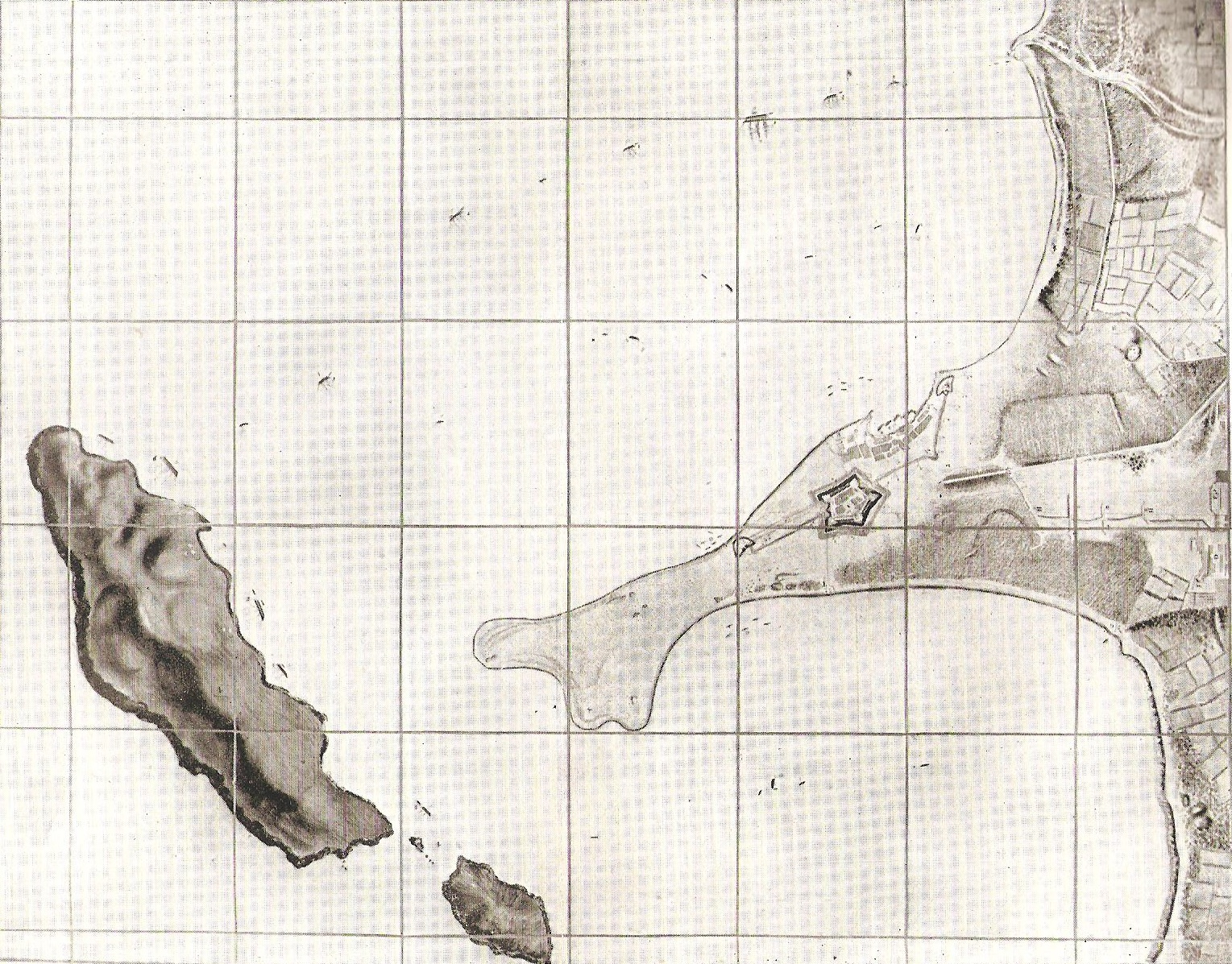
Illustration of the fortified port of Callao and the island of San Lorenzo

Since the arrival in September of the liberating expedition to the Peruvian coast, the Spanish Navy had not accomplished any effective actions to repel or at least harass the revolutionaries, granting them control of the sea. This was due to the inflexible defensive policy of the Viceroy Pezuela, and the incompetence of the Commanding General of Navy Antonio Vacaro.

The Spanish fleet, based in Callao, was mainly formed by the frigates Prueba, Venganza and Esmeralda, together with several other armed ships. The first two frigates, commanded by Captain José Villegas, left the port on 10 October towards the Peruvian south coast with the purpose of embarking troops, leaving the third frigate and the other ships under the impressive defense of the port, constituting a floating palisade that was protected with gunboats and batteries. Vacaro made this third naval unit the flagship of the squadron under his command.

This was the situation of the Spanish fleet at the time when Cochrane had established the blockade of Callao on 30 October, having at his disposal the frigates O'Higgins and Lautaro, and the corvette Independencia.

=== The Cochrane plan ===
The blockade was maintained without difficulty by the Chilean fleet, since the Spanish fleet remained entirely on the defensive. However, this inactivity, made Cochrane impatient, and led him to undertake naval action.

To break the monotony of the blockade, he planned to inflict a great blow on the Royalists in their strong defenses, similar to the capture of the defensive system of Valdivia earlier that year. On the basis of his own information and that of a subordinate, he decided to undertake a surprise assault, entering the port at night with several boats and seizing the Esmeralda by means of a boarding attack. As a complement to this plan, he intended to capture or burn the other ships.

Cochrane began preparations for the attack that he had personally decided to direct, with his usual attention to detail. For three days, the crew was trained to row silently and climb the sides of the ships, without informing them of their target. On 1 November he had given instructions for the attack to his immediate subordinates. On the night of 4 November, he practiced a reconnaissance in the bay, which was a test run for the operation executed the next night.

At dawn on 5 November, final preparations were made for the attack, and a speech by Cochrane was read to motivate the crew.

== Opposing forces ==
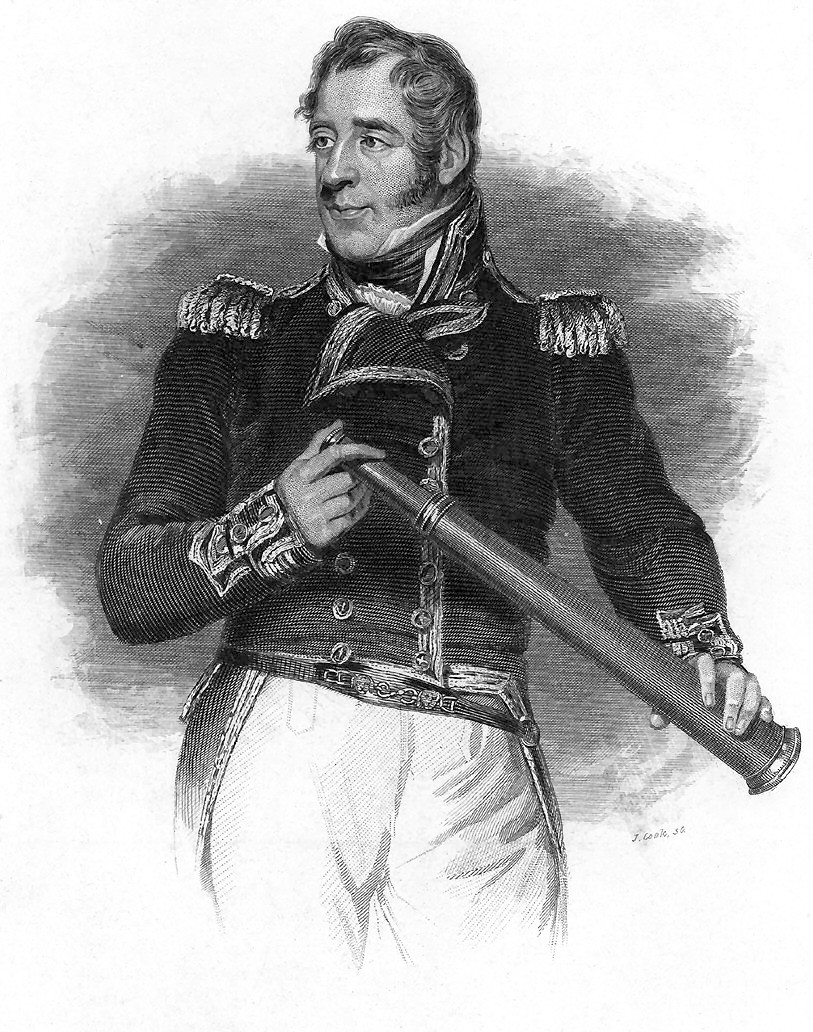
Vice Admiral Thomas Cochrane personally participated in the attack

=== Chilean Navy ===
Cochrane gathered his 240 men chosen for the attack, of which 160 were sailors and 80 were marines. The team was composed of 92 men of O'Higgins, 99 of Lautaro and 49 of Independencia.

Regarding the nationality of the crew belonging to the navy that was chosen for the attack, Chilean historian Lopez Urrutia, and also Cubitt, give some figures: (Note: With respect to the 27 foreign officers, Cubitt indicates that they were all British or North American, and López Urrutia simply understands that they were all foreigners. Of the 5 remaining officers, Cubitt is silent, but López Urrutia clarifies that they were Chilean. With respect to the foreign crew, neither Lopez Urrutia nor Cubitt (except the officers) specifies the nationality of the crew, although it is very probable that most of them are British or North American or that all have been of those nationalities. This could be due to the fact that both components were among the majority of the foreigners of the Chilean Navy. As for the 92 crew members of O'Higgins, López Urrutia and Cubitt are silent about their nationality, but the Chilean historian Luis Uribe, based on the official part of Cochrane, indicates the presence of Chilean and foreign components. With respect to the 99 members of Lautaro, López Urrutia indicates that half of them were Chilean and Cubitt indicates that almost half (43) were Chilean.)

Name of the ship	Number of men	Chileans	Foreigners
O'Higgins	92	?	?
Lautaro	99	43 relative	56 relative
Independecia	49	15	34
Total crew	240	?	?
Total of officers	32	5	27

They embarked on 14 oared boats, divided into two groups:

- The first group, formed by seven boats of O'Higgins, commanded by Captain Thomas Crosbie.
- The second group, formed by seven boats from Lautaro and Independencia, commanded by Captain Martin Guise.

Cochrane joined the first group to direct the attack, leaving Captain Robert Foster in charge of all the ships in his absence.

For the attack, they were armed with pistols, boarding axes, daggers or machetes, and short pikes. The attackers wore white jackets with a blue armband for recognition. If the clothes were not visible in the dark, the words "Gloria" and "Victoria" would be used as a signal.

The oars of the boats were wrapped in canvas to muffle noise when moving in the water.

=== Spanish Navy and defense of the port ===
The Spanish Navy stationed in Callao, under the command of Vacaro, consisted of:

- Flagship Esmeralda (40 guns), commanded by Captain Luis Coig. On the frigate, in addition to the sailors, were on board some troops of the Real Carlos battalion and army gunners. There was a crew of 313 between officers and men.
- Brig Maipú (16 guns), under the command of Lieutenant Antonio Madroño.
- Brig Pezuela (20 guns), under the command of Lieutenant Ramón Bañuelos.
- Pailebot Aránzazu (11 guns), commanded by his private pilot Juan Agustín de Ibarra.

There were also 14 to 24 gunboats and an undetermined number of armed merchant ships.

In addition to the naval squadron, there was the artillery of the fortresses and batteries of the port in charge of Brigadier Juan Francisco Sánchez, which consisted:

- Fortresses of Real Felipe, San Rafael and San Miguel.
- Batteries of the Arsenal and San Juaquín.

The defensive formation of the royalists consisted of a floating barrier formed by trunks attached to chains, which protected the approaches to the ships and left only a small opening for entry or exit. This floating chain was guarded by the gunboats, and behind this chain were anchored Esmeralda, Maipú (these two at the northern end of the roadstead) Pezuela and Aránzazu, forming the head of the line of ships. In the rear were the armed merchant ships. All this defensive disposition of the squadron was also protected by the batteries of the port. It was an imposing defensive disposition.

== Battle ==
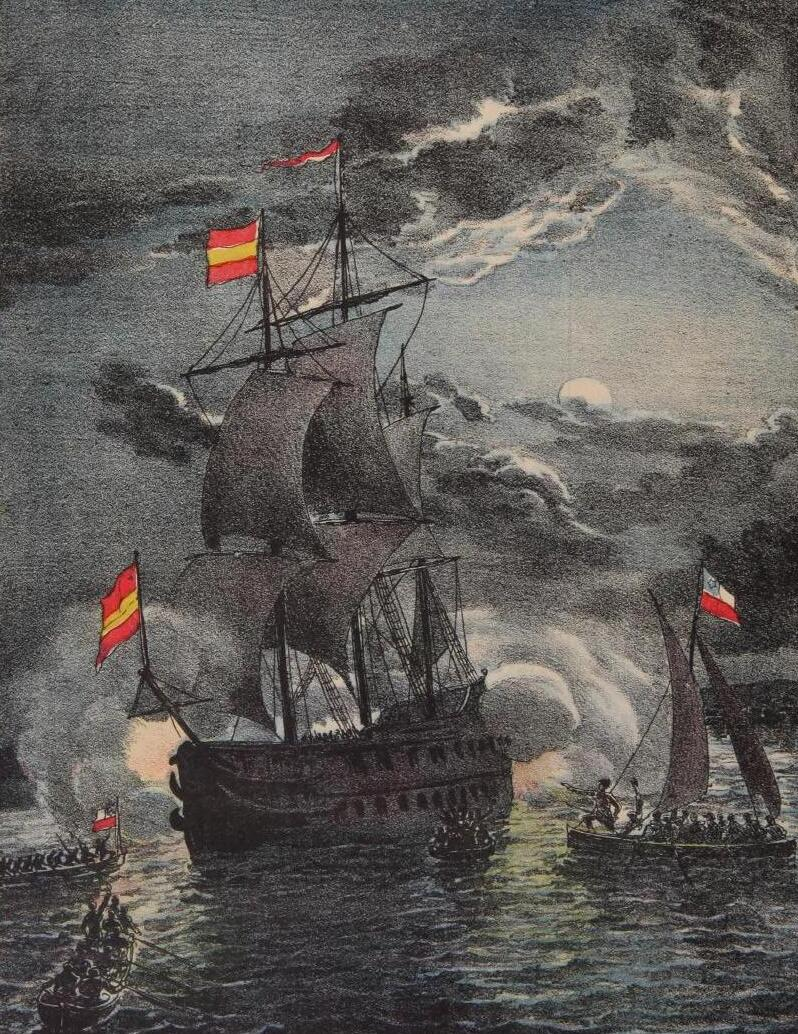
Chilean boats approaching Esmeralda

On the afternoon of 5 November, Cochrane ordered Lautaro and Independencia to sea, leaving O'Higgins near the island of San Lorenzo, and on its hidden side, the boats with their crew destined to attack. With this movement he succeeded in deceiving the Royalists. At 10 o'clock at night, the boats separated from O'Higgins, approaching the entrance of the floating chain that protected the Spanish ships. The boats advanced in two parallel columns under Crosbie and Guise.

The Chilean force sailed to reach the coast near the battery of San Juaquín, which defended the northern end of the port, and then went between the San Miguel fortress and the anchorage of neutral ships, hiding them from view. The neutrals were very close to the opening of the floating chain. When passing through that place, they found the frigates USS Macedonian and HMS Hyperion, which were the closest to the entrance of the Royalist defense. The American ship, upon seeing them, wished them good luck in the attack, while the British hailed the boats to establish their identities. The hail was not heard by the Royalists in the port. All this silent movement carried out until now to approach the roadstead, had lasted two hours.

At midnight, the boats arrived at the entrance to the floating chain barrier and saw a gunboat guarding the place, with a lieutenant and 14 men on board, so they approached and surprised her, managing to capture her with the crew and preventing an alert. They then passed the chain, and at approximately 12:30 a.m. on 6 November, they approached Esmeralda and boarded from opposite sides simultaneously. Crosbie's column, at whose head was Cochrane, attacked to starboard, while Guise's column to port. At that time, Coig was in the cabin talking to some officers, and the crew was sleeping, many of them on the deck. Only the guards were on watch. (Note: There are historiographical differences with respect to the moment in which the Royalists noticed the attack. The Chilean historian Barros Arana, the British historian Brian Vale and the Spanish historian Fernandez Duro indicate that they realized the surprise when the attackers were already aboard Esmeralda. The British historian J. Cubitt and the Peruvian historian Sotelo indicate that the Chilean boats were sighted during their approach to the ship, but the Esmeralda was surprised by their proximity and fast boarding.)

The sleepy crew, newly aware of the attack, took up arms to counter-attack, but as Cochrane later stated: "the Chilean machetes did not give them much time to organize and recover their spirit". But in spite of the surprise, they gave some resistance in the places that were attacked, giving rise to a bloody fight with sharp weapons and firearms. However, the impetus of the Chilean attack was irresistible and soon occupied the quarterdeck, the frigate's quarters and the stern.

The Royalists were pushed to the forecastle, and there they withstood the attack bravely until the forces of Crosbie and Guise united and charged upon the position. Some of the attackers, who, according to the instructions, had climbed to the tops in the first moments of the boarding, fired down from this height. Having occupied the bow, Guise cleared the lower deck of the troops that were firing upwards through the hatches. Shortly before 1 a.m. the attackers were in possession of the ship, and the Royalist crew that survived, surrendered. During the fight, Cochrane received a blow at the beginning and in the final stage a shot that pierced his thigh, leading him to sit on the deck and try to direct the attack as best he could.

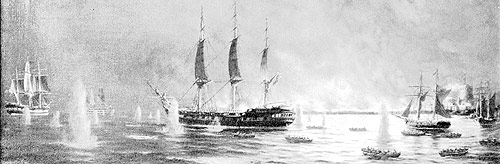
Esmeralda at the time of its capture by the Chilean forces, being attacked by the Royalists

The fight in Esmeralda alerted the batteries, gunboats and other ships in the port . Fugitives of the frigate who threw themselves into the sea to escape and reported to other ships that she had been captured.

When the fight ended on Esmeralda, Cochrane tried to execute the next complement of his plan, but without success. (Note: Cochrane had planned to use the captured frigate as a platform from which to attack other vessels in the harbor. Some of the junior officers had orders to attack Maipú and Pezuela, and other officers were ordered to cut adrift the other heavy ships and merchant ships that were nearby.) The failure stemmed from the actions of crew members, in the midst of the victory, who began to loot the ship and got drunk with the alcohol they found. When some officers urged them to return to the boats to continue the attack against the other Spanish ships, they flatly refused, saying that they had done enough. The few sailors that the officers managed to embark attacked Maipú and Pezuela, but were repelled by the by-now prepared ships, with the support of several gunboats directed by Vacaro, who was patrolling the bay. However, the Spanish commander could not do anything to recover his flagship.

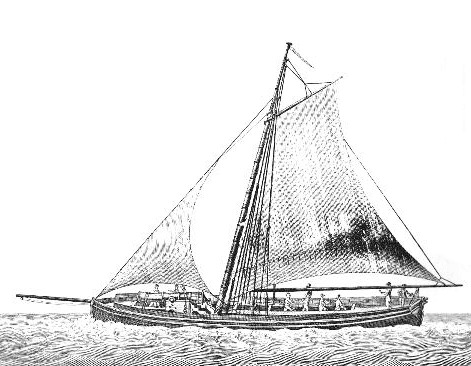
Spanish gunboat from the late 18th century

Finally, Cochrane ordered Guise to take Esmeralda out of the bay, beginning to move outward along with all the boats and two captured gunboats; the one that watched at the entrance of the floating chain and another that had approached the frigate during the climax of the fight. The batteries, observing that and understanding the situation, began to fire to prevent Esmeralda's removal. The ships and gunboats also attacked her. Several shots hit the Esmeralda, one entered through one of the stern windows and damaged the quarterdeck, causing the death of some men and wounding Coig, who was being held prisoner there.

In these circumstances, the neutral ships USS Macedonian and HMS Hyperion began to move away from the bay to get out of reach of the batteries. At the same time, they placed lamps in their rigging as pre-arranged signals to avoid attack. Cochrane realized this and, understanding its meaning, ordered identical lamps in Esmeralda's rigging. This caused confusion in the batteries that could not determine which of the three ships with lights was the captured frigate, showing reluctance to direct their shots at the foreign ships, so that at approximately 1:15 a.m. their fire began to decrease.

Esmeralda left the port and around 2:30 a.m. anchored out of range of batteries near O'Higgins. With it came all the smaller boats, which were towing the two captured gunboats. A little known fact referred by an eyewitness of the attacking forces affirms that one of the boats that belonged to O'Higgins had gone astray, and that during the rest of the night the batteries continued to open fire, without understanding the reason. The doubts disappeared when the sun appeared and the missing boat was seen leaving the port, towing a large gunboat that it had captured, quickly receiving assistance.

== Aftermath ==
=== Analysis ===
Chilean naval researcher Jorge Ureta Muñoz affirms that the main factors that contributed to the successful capture of the frigate are due to the coordination of the details, the general idea of a proven plan, the efficient and energetic execution led by Cochrane himself, and the value of its participants. It also highlights the great importance that the realization of a naval action of this type can have, in the sense that with proportionately limited means, an extraordinary advantage can be obtained, also mentally, by dislocating material from the adversary, at a minimum cost.

The Spanish historian Fernández Duro compares this naval action with the capture of the Hermione, in Puerto Cabello, in 1799, but affirming that he surpasses it in daring.

According to Spanish historiography, the attack was verified during a ceasefire.

=== Effects ===
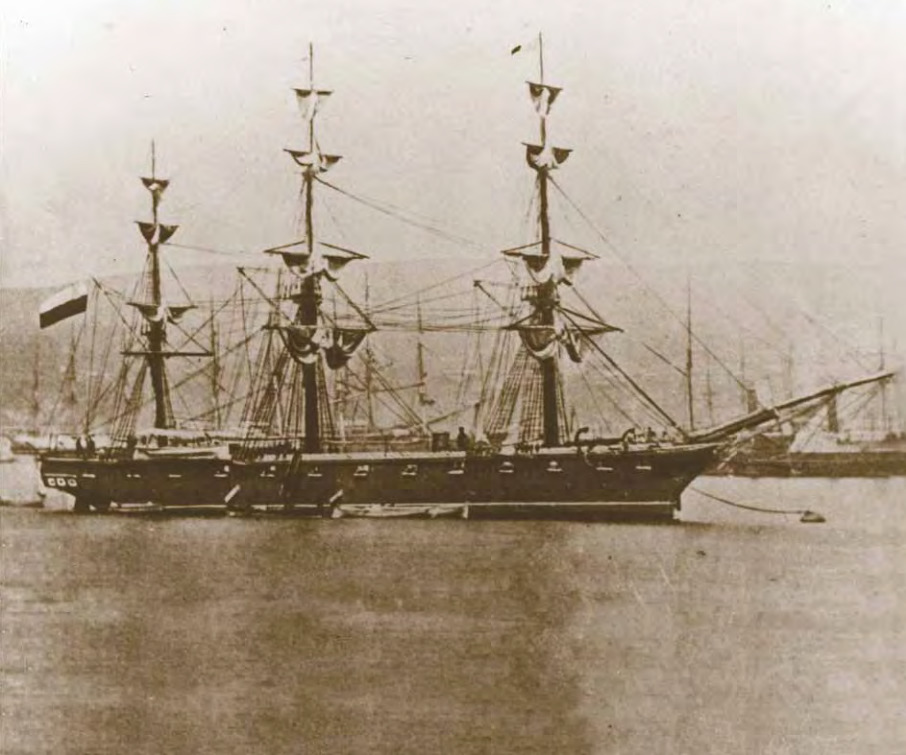
Steam corvette Esmeralda (1855)

=== Legacy ===
In 1855, by means of a supreme decree issued on 26 June, the Chilean government named a corvette, which was built in the United Kingdom for the Chilean Navy, the Esmeralda, in memory of this action. In addition, the signals "Gloria" and "Victoria", which were used by Cochrane during the boarding attack, were awarded as the new Esmeralda's motto. This corvette perpetuated the name of Esmeralda in the future ships of the navy, partly due to its reckless performance in the battle of Iquique on 21 May 1879, during the development of the Pacific War. Currently, the sixth vessel that bears the name is the Esmeralda (BE-43).

The Chilean historian Barros Arana indicated in his book written in 1894, that this naval action has been the battle of the Spanish American wars of independence that has been narrated most often in diverse historiographical works.

== Bibliography ==
- Barros Arana, Diego (1894). Historia General de Chile (in Spanish). Vol. XIII. Santiago, Chile: Imprenta Cervantes.
- López Urrutia, Carlos (2007). Historia de la Marina de Chile (in Spanish). Vol. Segunda Edición. Santiago, Chile: El Ciprés Editores. ISBN 978-0-6151-8574-3.
- Fernández Duro, Cesáreo (1903). Armada Española desde la unión de los reinos de Castilla y Aragón (in Spanish). Vol. IX. Madrid, España: Instituto de Historia y Cultura Naval.
- Uribe Orrego, Luis (1892). Los Orígenes de Nuestra Marina Militar (in Spanish). Vol. Parte Segunda. Santiago, Chile: Imprenta Nacional.
- Vale, Brian (2008). Cochrane in the Pacific: Fortune and Freedom in Spanish America. London, England: I.B.Tauris. ISBN 978-1-84511-446-6.
- Vázquez de Acuña, Isidoro (2003). Estertores Navales Realistas (in Spanish). Santiago, Chile: Anales del Instituto de Chile.
- Cubitt, David John (1974). Lord Cochrane and the Chilean Navy, 1818-1823. Edinburgh, Scotland: University of Edinburgh Ph D Thesis. hdl:1842/6535.
- Ortiz Sotelo, Jorge (2015). La Real Armada en el Pacífico Sur (in Spanish). Vol. Capitulo 9 y Anexo 2. México: Universidad Nacional Autónoma de México, Instituto de Investigaciones Históricas, Bonilla Artigas Editores. ISBN 978-607-8348-61-9.
- Ureta Muñoz, Jorge (1993). "Captura de la fragata española "Esmeralda" en el Callao, bajo la perspectiva de las operaciones especiales" (PDF). Revista de Marina de la Armada de Chile (in Spanish). Viña del Mar, Chile. Archived from the original (PDF) on 2020-11-10.
