= Paul Delano =

American-Chilean sea captain (1775–1842)

- Born: June 15, 1775; Fairhaven, Massachusetts, U.S.
- Died: February 4, 1842 (aged 66); Talcahuano, Chile
- Occupation: Sea captain
- Spouse: Ann Ferguson Hinckley
- Parents: Nathan Pope Delano; Sarah Tripp

Captain Paul Delano (June 15, 1775 – February 4, 1842) was an American-born sea captain and a member of the prominent American Delano family.

== Early life ==
Delano was born in Fairhaven, Massachusetts, on June 15, 1775, to Nathan Pope Delano and Sarah (née Tripp) Delano.

A descendant of Philip Delano, Paul's paternal grandparents Jethro Delano and Elizabeth (née Pope) Delano. His grandfather Jethro's younger brother, Thomas Delano, was himself the grandfather of Warren Delano Sr. (the father of Franklin Hughes Delano and Warren Delano Jr., as well as a grandfather of Warren Delano IV, Frederic Adrian Delano, and Sara Delano Roosevelt, the mother of U.S. President Franklin Delano Roosevelt).

== Career ==
He moved to Chile as Captain of the Curiacio where he arrived on June 22, 1819, and became an important part of that country's First Chilean Navy Squadron. He came with his two sons, Paul H., and William.

Paul Delano was commissioned as a captain and commanded sixteen troop means of transport of the Freedom Expedition of Perú and later he commanded the Lautaro.

In 1822, he became Captain of the port of Valparaíso where he directed the building of the first wharf and the first lighthouse of the port in 1837.

== Personal life ==
Delano was married to Ann Ferguson Hinckley. Together, they were the parents of:

- Paul Hinckley Delano (1806–1881), who became Lord Admiral Thomas Cochrane's personal aide and, at fourteen years of age, was given command of one of the boarding parties during the capture of the Esmeralda (1791) in the port of Callao on 5 November 1820.

Delano died on February 4, 1842, in Talcahuano, Chile.

== See also ==
- First Chilean Navy Squadron
- Chilean frigate Independencia (1818)
- Freedom Expedition of Perú
