= Chilean corvette Chacabuco (1818) =

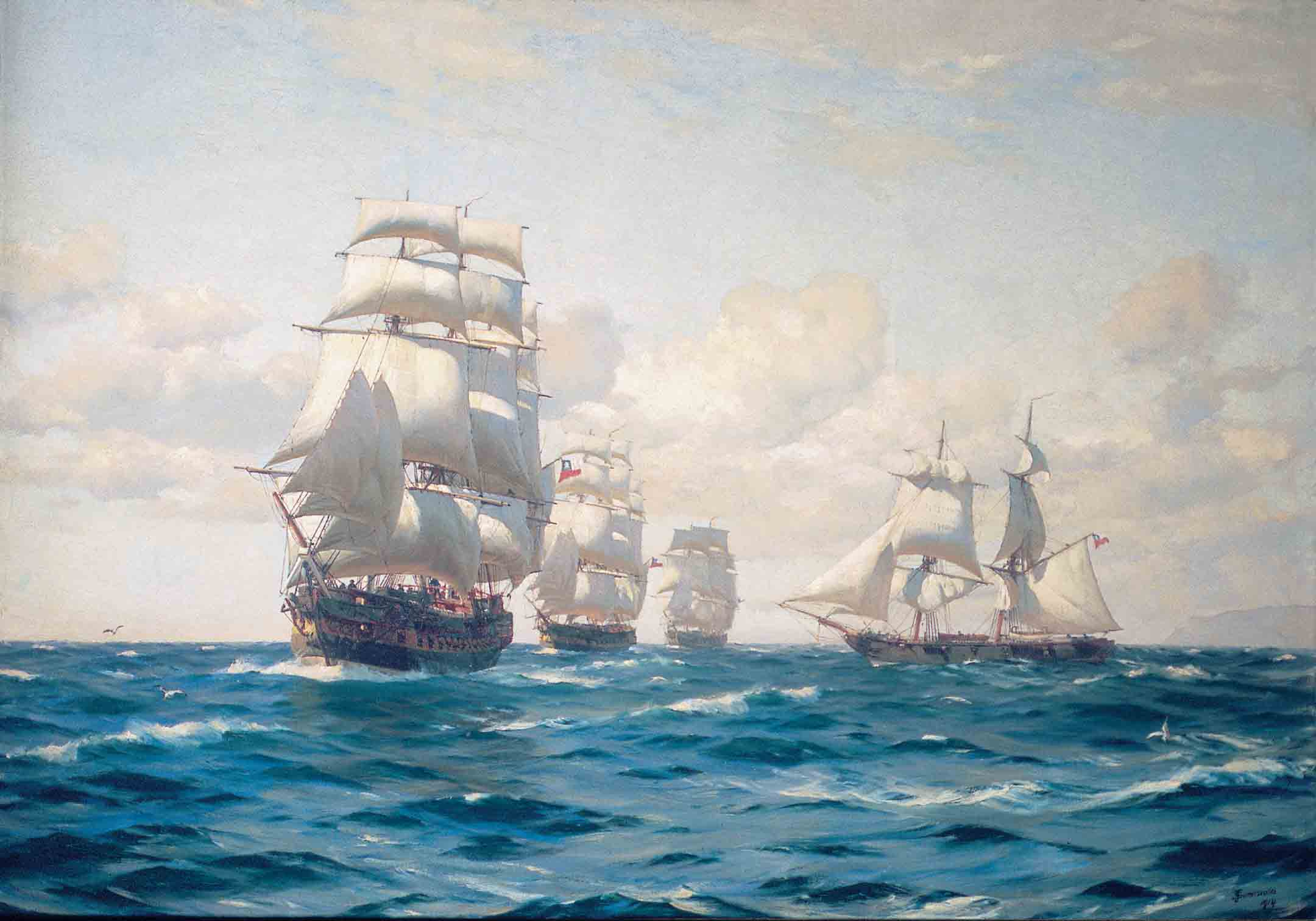
- From left to right San Martín, Lautaro, Chacabuco and Araucano, in a painting of Thomas Somerscales

History

United States
- Name: Avon
- Launched: 1815
- Acquired: by purchase, 20 June 1818
- Fate: Sold to Chilean privateers

Chilean privateers
- Name: Coquimbo
- Fate: Sold to Navy of Chile

Chile
- Name: Chacabuco
- Namesake: Battle of Chacabuco
- Launched: 1815
- Acquired: by purchase, 20 June 1818
- Honours and awards: First Chilean Navy Squadron
- Fate: Sold to Argentina, 1 April 1826

Argentina
- Name: Chacabuco
- Honours and awards: Chacabuco the only one to reach Buenos Aires.

General characteristics
- Type: Corvette
- Tons burthen: 450 tons bm
- Length: 131 ft 3 in (40.01 m)
- Beam: 26 ft 3 in (8.00 m)
- Depth: 8 ft 2 in (2.49 m)
- Sail plan: Full-rigged ship
- Complement: 80
- Armament: 18 × 12-pounder guns; 2 × 9-pounder guns

Chacabuco was a 20-gun corvette of 450 tons built in 1815 in Boston, USA. She came to Coquimbo as Avon where investors in Copiapó, Chile, purchased her to use her as privateer vessel under the name Coquimbo. But as the businessmen drew back, the Chilean government bought the ship on 20 June 1818 for $36,000. She was renamed Chacabuco and commissioned to the Navy under the command of Captain Francisco Díaz.

In October 1818 she participated with the First Chilean Navy Squadron under the command of Manuel Blanco Encalada in the campaign to deter the Spanish convoy of the frigate María Isabel. She was not involved in the capture of the frigate in Talcahuano, but on 18 November she captured the Spanish transporters Jerezana, Carlota and Rosalía of the convoy.

On 24 March 1819, during the second blockade of Callao she captured the Spanish sloop Moctezuma.

In 1826 she set sail with Galvarino, Aquiles, O'Higgins and Lautaro from Corral under the command of Manuel Blanco Encalada in order to capture the last Spanish enclave in South America, Chiloé, commanded by Antonio de Quintanilla.

== Fate ==
Chacabuco was sold to Argentina on 1 April 1826, together with O'Higgins and Independencia. Out of the three she was the only one to reach Buenos Aires. (O'Higgins sank while rounding Cape Horn; Independencia sank in Talcahuano but was refloated and sold to Peru).

== See also ==
- First Chilean Navy Squadron
- List of decommissioned ships of the Chilean Navy
- Painting of the AVON
