= Chilean brigantine Águila (1796) =

Águila
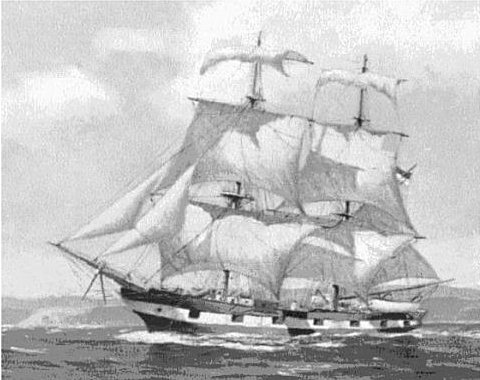
- Brigantine Águila

History

United States
- Name: Eagle
- Operator: Smuggler
- Launched: 1796
- Fate: Confiscated by Spain

Spain
- Name: Águila
- Captured: 26 February 1817
- Fate: Captured or handed over to Chile

Chile
- Name: Águila
- Commissioned: 26 February 1817
- Renamed: Pueyrredón 14 July 1818
- Honours and awards: Participated in: Freedom Expedition Force to Perú; Capture of Perla
- Fate: Sunk in Ancón District 1837

General characteristics
- Tonnage: 220
- Sail plan: Brigantine
- Armament: 16 guns

Águila was the first naval vessel of the Chilean Navy. She was later renamed Pueyrredón.

== US time ==
She was the old US-smuggler Eagle, a 220-ton brig with sixteen guns, launched in England in 1796.

== Spanish career ==
Coming from Buenos Aires without documents or license with a contraband of lingerie the ship was captured by the Spaniards in Coquimbo but this capture was not informed to the Spanish Navy in Callao. The ship with the new crew sailed to then Spanish Valparaíso and refitted as a 50-gun ship and was put under the command of Spanish Captain José Anacleto Goñi and manned with 50 Chileans (in Spanish originarios). The next time the ship was seen in Paita in November 1816 and few days later sailed, allegedly, to the port of destination Galápagos. The Spanish commandant of Callao, Antonio Vacaro, was informed from Paita about this new ship in his naval division, but due to the circumstances he mistrusted Captain Goñi and his crew. Moreover, he learned that the real destination of the ship was Panama City. Consequently, he ordered the commandants of the ports of Guayaquil and Paita to replace Goñi with a trustworthy captain, to man the ship with at least 2/3 Spaniards (in Spanish europeos) and to send the ship immediately to Callao on its return from Panama.

The Spanish author Gaspar Pérez Turrado supposes that Goñi was a supporter of the Chilean Independence and that as he learned about the triumph of the Chileans he sailed to Valparaíso in order to hand the ship over to the revolutionaries.

== Chilean career ==
Meanwhile, after the defeat in the Battle of Chacabuco (12 February 1817) the Spaniards lost the control of Valparaíso albeit they were able to blockade the port temporarily with the ships Esmeralda and Pezuela.

On 26 February 1817 the ship entered Valparaíso and the Chilean Authority assumed command over the ship. Some sources assert that the ship was captured by the Chileans. Anyway, she came under the command of Raymond Morris an Irish mercenary and former lieutenant in the British Royal Navy.

The ship sailed on 17 March 1817 to rescue a group of 78 Chilean patriots being held prisoners in the Juan Fernández Islands and came back to Valparaíso fourteen days later. The group included Manuel Blanco Encalada, who subsequently led the Navy and, in later years, became the first President of Chile and Francisco de la Lastra later Intendant of Santiago and Privy Councillor. As such, he became temporary Supreme Director.

On 14 July 1818 she had been renamed Pueyrredón to honour the Argentine Juan Martín de Pueyrredón, Supreme Director of the United Provinces of the Río de la Plata who strongly supported the independence of Chile.

She captured on 8 October 1818 the Spanish corvette Perla (Ex-US-Pearl).

On 9 October 1818, Pueyrredón sailed from Valparaíso with others ships to deter a Spanish expedition from Cádiz made up of eleven transports and the-then Spanish frigate María Isabel. It carried 2000 soldiers as well as weapons, ammunition, and supplies to reinforce the Viceroyalty of Perú. The Chilean squadron under commander Blanco Encalada captured María Isabel on 28 October in Talcahuano. On 11 November 1818 they captured Dolores, Magdalena, Elena, Jerezana and Carlota at Santa Maria Island.

On 16 January 1819, Pueyrredónsailed from Valparaíso with the First Chilean Navy Squadron, under the command of Admiral Lord Thomas Alexander Cochrane to the first blockade of Callao, later Pueyrredón, Galvarino and Araucano under the command of Blanco Encalada. In June were all the Chilean ships back in Valparaíso.

On 12 September 1819, Pueyrredón sailed Cochrane and Blanco Encalada again to the second blockade of Callao with a squadron composed of O'Higgins, San Martín, Lautaro, Independencia, Galvarino, and Araucano.

Pueyrredón was used to shell Callao with the Congreve rocket and later ordered to Guayaquil to search for the Spanish Prueba. In December 1819 were most of the Chilean ships back in Valparaíso, as the Pueyrredón also.

On 21 August 1820 the Freedom Expedition Force of Peru sailed with Pueyrredón under the ships of the squadron.

On 6 September 1837, despite Cochrane's efforts to retrieve the ship, she sank in Ancón.

== See also ==
- List of decommissioned ships of the Chilean Navy
