= 1833 in Chile =

- Decades: 1810s; 1820s; 1830s; 1840s; 1850s
- See also: Other events of 1833; Timeline of Chilean history

The following lists events that happened during 1833 in Chile.

== Incumbents ==
President of Chile: José Joaquín Prieto

== Events ==
=== May ===
- 25 May - The Chilean Constitution of 1833 is promulgated.

== Births ==
- 10 October - Melchor de Concha y Toro (d. 1892)
- 27 December - José Velásquez Bórquez (d. 1897)

=== Full date unknown ===
- José del Carmen Quesada del Río (d. 1885), lawyer and magistrate

== Deaths ==
- 23 July - Anselmo de la Cruz
