= 1844 in Chile =

- Decades: 1820s; 1830s; 1840s; 1850s; 1860s
- See also: Other events of 1844; Timeline of Chilean history

The following lists events that happened during 1844 in Chile.

== Incumbents ==
President of Chile: Manuel Bulnes

== Events ==
- date unknown - Spain recognizes the independence of Chile.

== Births ==
- 5 February - Agustín Ross (d. 1926)
- 15 July - Enrique Mac Iver (d. 1922)

== Deaths ==
- 9 April - José Miguel Infante (b. 1778)
- 13 September - Bernardino Bilbao Beyner (b. 1788)
