= 1832 in Chile =

- Decades: 1810s; 1820s; 1830s; 1840s; 1850s
- See also: Other events of 1832; Timeline of Chilean history

The following lists events that happened during 1832 in Chile.

== Incumbents ==
President of Chile: José Joaquín Prieto

== Events ==
=== January ===
- 14 January - Battle of Epulafquen

== Births ==
- date unknown - Pedro Lagos (d. 1884)
- 21 February - Maximiano Errázuriz (d. 1890)

== Deaths ==
- 19 April - Melchor José Ramos (b. 1805)
