= Chilean brigantine Araucano =

Gun brigantine of the First Chilean Navy Squadron

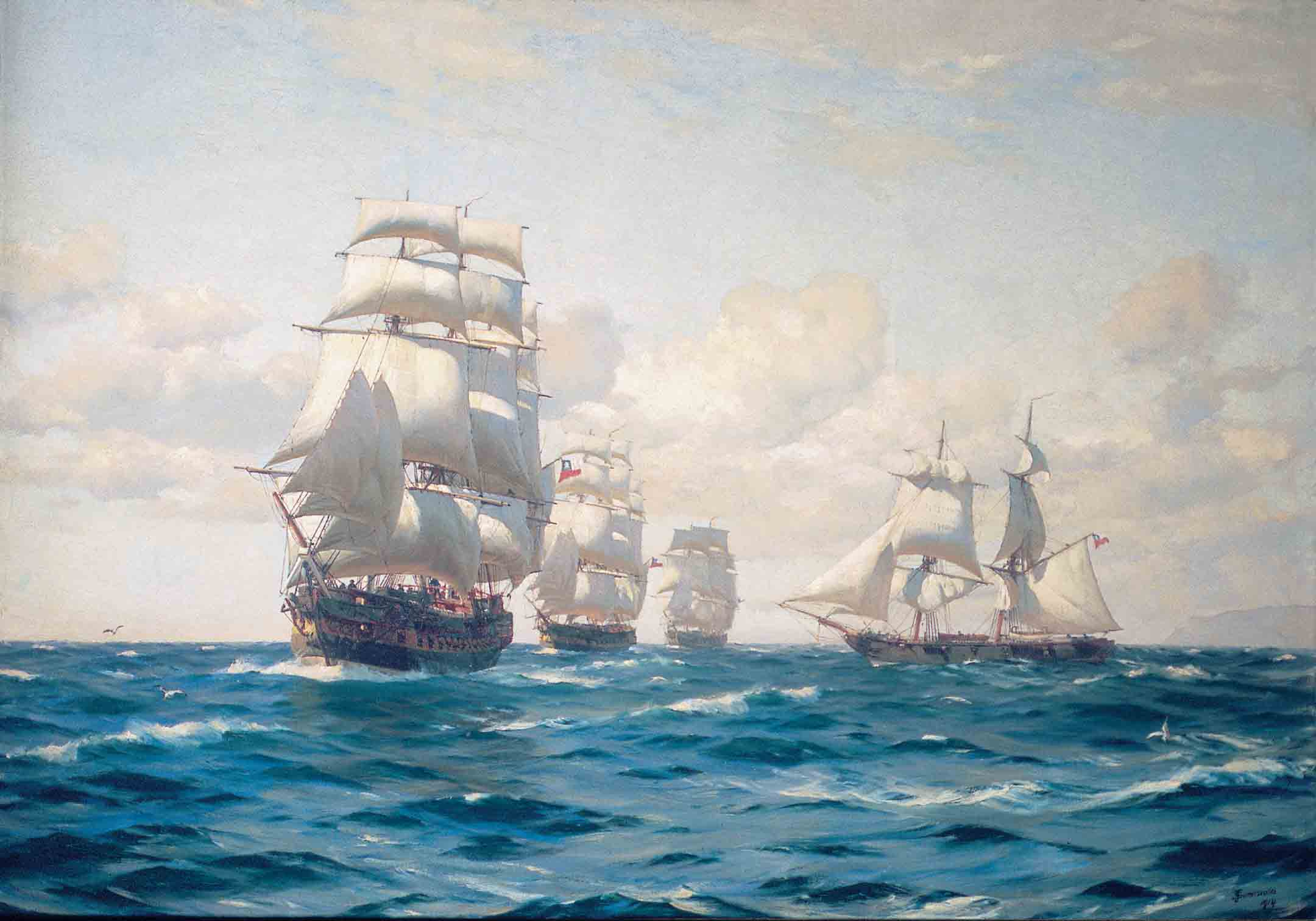
- San Martin, Lautaro, Chacabuco, and Araucano

History

United States
- Name: Columbus
- Launched: 1817
- Fate: Sold to Chile

Chile
- Name: Araucano
- Namesake: Araucano
- Cost: $33,000
- Acquired: 1818
- Honours and awards: Expedition to California pursuing the Spanish Prueba and Venganza
- Fate: Mutiny in 1822
- Name: Prudence
- Fate: Scrapped in Tubuai Island

General characteristics
- Tons burthen: 217 (bm)
- Armament: 16–18 guns

Araucano was a 16- or 18-gun brigantine of the First Chilean Navy Squadron.

== Ship history ==
The ship was built in 1817 in the United States as Columbus. In November 1817 she was sent by the envoy of the Chilean government in the United States Manuel Hemanegildo Aguirre, fully manned and carrying a cargo of munitions, under the command of Charles Whiting Wooster (Carlos Guillermo Wooster, sometimes erroneously known as Worster) to Valparaíso, where she arrived in June 1818. The Columbus was then sold to Chile for $33,000 On August 10 she was renamed Araucano and on 14 August was under the command of Wooster but in October 1818, as the First Chilean Navy Squadron under the command of Blanco Encalada left Valparaíso to South, she was under the command of Raymond Morris and carried 110 men. She participated in the blockade of Callao during the Freedom Expedition of Perú.

In 1821 the Chilean ships Independencia, San Martin, Mercedes and Araucano sailed to North America on pursuit of the last presence of the Spanish Navy in the Pacific coast, the frigates Prueba and Venganza. As Cochrane ordered the Araucano under the command of Captain Robert Simpson to investigate the situation in Acapulco, California, the crew of Araucano, led by Henry Good (also known as Patterson), mutinied in Loreto, Baja California Sur and under the command of an English boatswain sailed to Hawaii, Australia and then Tahiti, where they became pirates and sealers. They were captured as they tried to seize a missionary ship off the Tubuai Island. The Araucano remained placed at the disposal of the Chilean Government but she was never reclaimed and she was scrapped by the natives.

On 23 June 1822 the Prudence (ex–Araucano) was captured by the crew of the Queen Charlotte under command of Captain Samuel Henry (22 years old) while mooring at the harbor Tubuai. But the piratical brig was declared un-seaworthy; she therefore remained mooring at Otaheite, and became a wreck.» (Sydney Gazette 22 November 1822). The Chileans too judged that the Araucano was best left to rot at Tahiti.

== See also ==
- First Chilean Navy Squadron
