= 1842 in Chile =

- Decades: 1820s; 1830s; 1840s; 1850s; 1860s
- See also: Other events of 1842; Timeline of Chilean history

The following lists events that happened during 1842 in Chile.

== Incumbents ==
President of Chile: Manuel Bulnes

== Births ==
- 14 April - Pedro Lucio Cuadra (died 1894)
- 10 July - Manuel Bulnes Pinto (died 1899)
- 14 October - Recaredo Santos Tornero (died 1902)

== Deaths ==
- date unknown - Juan Godoy (born 1800)
- 4 February - Paul Delano (born 1775)
- 24 October-Bernardo O'Higgins (born 1778)
