= 1838 in Chile =

- Decades: 1810s; 1820s; 1830s; 1840s; 1850s
- See also: Other events of 1838; Timeline of Chilean history

Events in the year 1838 in Chile.

== Incumbents ==
- President: José Joaquín Prieto

== Events ==
- January 12–13: War of the Confederation: Battle of Islay

== Births ==
- March 5 - Orozimbo Barbosa (d. 1891)
