= 1837 in Chile =

- Decades: 1810s; 1820s; 1830s; 1840s; 1850s
- See also: Other events of 1837; Timeline of Chilean history

The following lists events that happened during 1837 in Chile.

== Incumbents ==
President of Chile: José Joaquín Prieto

== Events ==
=== June ===
- 3 June - Chilean Army officer Jose Antonio Vidaurre attempts to overthrow the Prieto government. The coup fails and Vidaurre is later executed.

=== November ===
- 17 November - The Treaty of Paucarpata is signed, temporarily ending the War of the Confederation.
- 17 November - The 1837 Valdivia earthquake is felt from Concepción to Chonos Archipelago.

== Births ==
- 24 February – Delfina de la Cruz, pianist and First Lady of Chile (died 1905)
- 18 April – Eleuterio Ramírez, lieutenant colonel (died 1879)

== Deaths ==
- 4 October - José Antonio Vidaurre (b. 1798)
- 19 July - Agustín Eyzaguirre (b. 1768)
