= 1847 in Chile =

- Decades: 1820s; 1830s; 1840s; 1850s; 1860s
- See also: Other events of 1847; Timeline of Chilean history

The following events happened in Chile in the year 1847.

== Incumbents ==
President of Chile: Manuel Bulnes

== Events ==
=== September ===
- 17 September - The National Statistics Institute (Chile) is established.

== Births ==
- 12 April - Aníbal Zañartu (d. 1902)
- 13 August - Luis Uribe (d. 1914)

== Deaths ==
- 16 July - José Ignacio Zenteno (b. 1786)
- 8 November - José Ignacio Cienfuegos (b. 1762)
