= 1831 in Chile =

- Decades: 1810s; 1820s; 1830s; 1840s; 1850s
- See also: Other events of 1831; Timeline of Chilean history

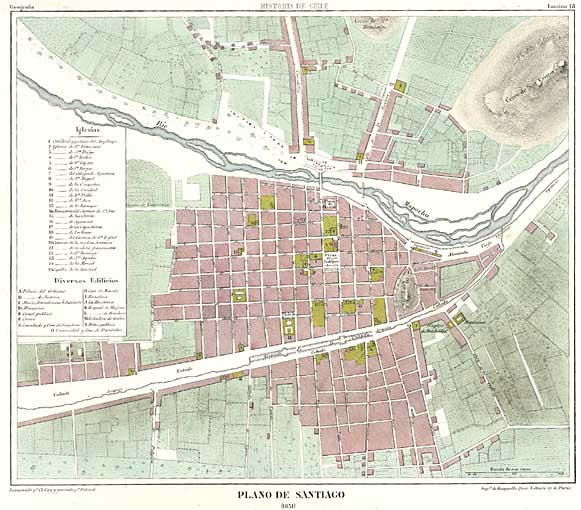
1831 Map of Santiago

The following lists events that happened during 1831 in Chile.

== Incumbents ==
President of Chile: José Tomás Ovalle y Bezanilla (-8 March), Fernando Errázuriz Aldunate(8 March-18 September), José Joaquín Prieto Vial (18 September-)

== Events ==
=== March ===
- 31 March - Chilean presidential election, 1831

== Deaths ==
- 21 March - José Tomás Ovalle y Bezanilla (b. 1787)
