= 1843 in Chile =

- Decades: 1820s; 1830s; 1840s; 1850s; 1860s
- See also: Other events of 1843; Timeline of Chilean history

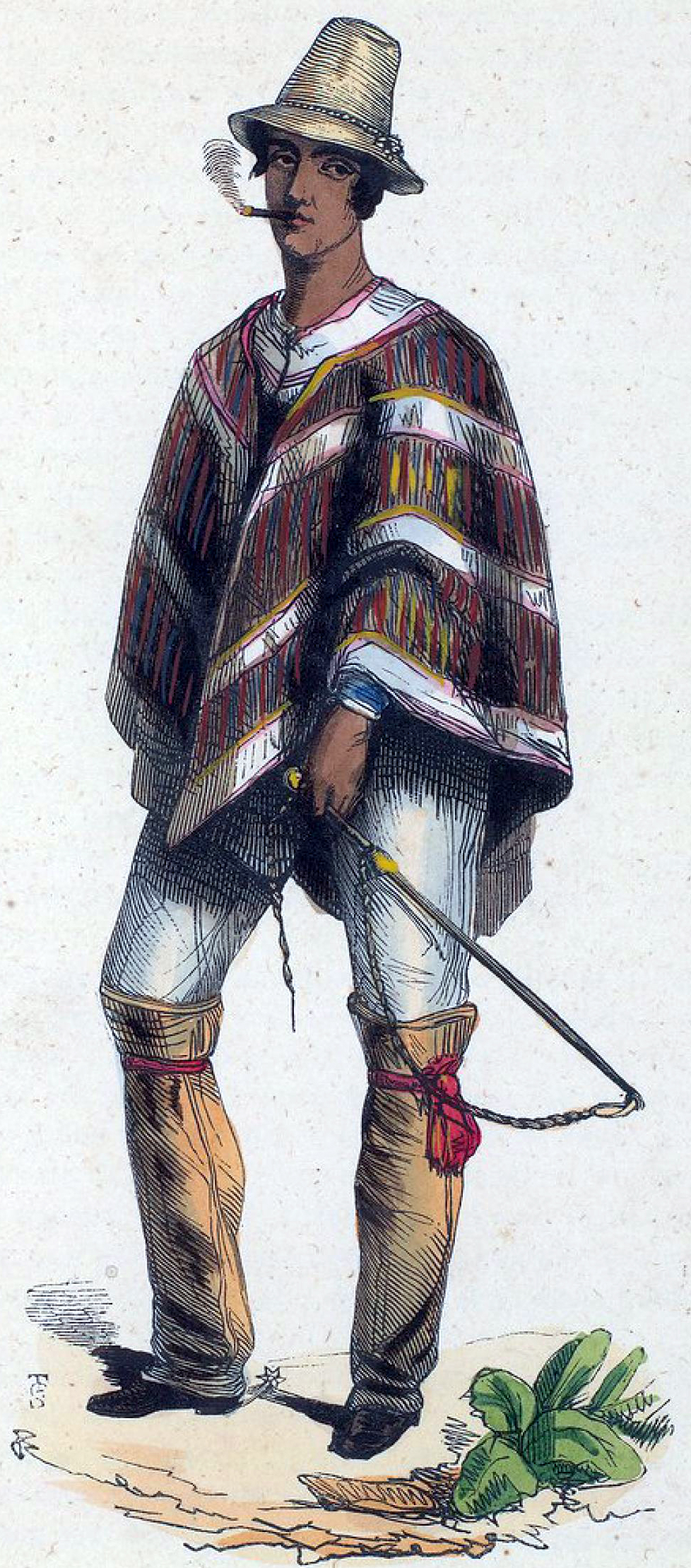

The following lists events that happened during 1843 in Chile.

== Incumbents ==
President of Chile: Manuel Bulnes

== Events ==
=== September ===
- 17 September - The University of Chile opens.
- 21 September - Chile takes possession of the Strait of Magellan.

== Births ==
- 14 August - Carlos Condell (died 1887)

== Deaths ==
- 3 May - Manuel Vicuña Larraín
