= 1834 in Chile =

- Decades: 1810s; 1820s; 1830s; 1840s; 1850s
- See also: Other events of 1834; Timeline of Chilean history

The following lists events that happened during 1834 in Chile.

== Incumbents ==
President of Chile: José Joaquín Prieto

== Events ==
=== June ===
- 26 June - The Coat of arms of Chile is adopted.

== Births ==
- 7 November - Manuel José Yrarrázaval Larraín (d. 1896)

== Deaths ==
- 10 October - Bernardino Escribano
