= 1830 in Chile =

- Decades: 1810s; 1820s; 1830s; 1840s; 1850s
- See also: Other events of 1830; Timeline of Chilean history

Events in the year 1830 in Chile.

== Incumbents ==
- President: Francisco Ruiz-Tagle until April 1, José Tomás Ovalle
- Vice President: José Tomás Ovalle until April 1

== Events ==
- April 1 - resignation of President Ruiz-Tagle
- April 17 - Chilean Civil War of 1829–30: Battle of Lircay, decisive Pelucones (Conservative) victory

== Births ==
- August 16 – Diego Barros Arana, historian (d. 1907)

== Deaths ==
- April 17 - Guillermo Tupper

== See also ==
Chilean Civil War of 1829–30
