= 1841 in Chile =

- Decades: 1820s; 1830s; 1840s; 1850s; 1860s
- See also: Other events of 1841; Timeline of Chilean history

The following lists events that happened during 1841 in Chile.

== Incumbents ==
President of Chile: José Joaquín Prieto Vial (-18 September), Manuel Bulnes Prieto (18 September-)

== Events ==
=== June ===
- 26 June - Chilean presidential election, 1841

== Births ==
- 10 April - Adolfo Rivadeneyra (died 1882)

== Deaths ==
- 16 August - Fernando Errázuriz Aldunate (born 1777)
