= 1835 in Chile =

- Decades: 1810s; 1820s; 1830s; 1840s; 1850s
- See also: Other events of 1835; Timeline of Chilean history

The following lists events that happened during 1835 in Chile.

== Incumbents ==
President of Chile: José Joaquín Prieto

== Events ==
=== February ===
- 20 February - 1835 Concepción earthquake

== Births ==
- 9 June - Ramón Barros Luco (d. 1919)
- 24 October - Vicente Reyes (d. 1918)
