= 1836 in Chile =

- Decades: 1810s; 1820s; 1830s; 1840s; 1850s
- See also: Other events of 1836; Timeline of Chilean history

The following lists events that happened during 1836 in Chile.

== Incumbents ==
President of Chile: José Joaquín Prieto

== Events ==
=== March ===
- 31 March - Chilean presidential election, 1836

=== July ===
- 28 July - Former Supreme Director Ramon Friere attempts to overthrow the government, but fails and is imprisoned.

=== December ===
- 28 December - Chile declares war on the Peruvian-Bolivian Confederation, starting the War of the Confederation.

== Births ==
- 18 April - Eleuterio Ramírez Molina (d. 1879)

== Deaths ==
- date unknown - José Santiago Muñoz (b. 1780)
