= 1839 in Chile =

- Decades: 1810s; 1820s; 1830s; 1840s; 1850s
- See also: Other events of 1839; Timeline of Chilean history

Events in the year 1839 in Chile.

== Incumbents ==
- President: José Joaquín Prieto

== Events ==
- January 6 - War of the Confederation: Battle of Buin
- January 12 - War of the Confederation: Battle of Casma
- January 20 - War of the Confederation: Battle of Yungay
