= 1840 in Chile =

- Decades: 1820s; 1830s; 1840s; 1850s; 1860s
- See also: Other events of 1840; Timeline of Chilean history

The following lists events that happened during 1840 in Chile.

== Incumbents ==
- President: José Joaquín Prieto

== Events ==
- July 1 - Establishment of the Roman Catholic Archdiocese of La Serena and the Roman Catholic Diocese of San Carlos de Ancud

== Births ==
- July 19 - José Manuel Balmaceda, President of Chile (died 1891)
