= 1845 in Chile =

- Decades: 1820s; 1830s; 1840s; 1850s; 1860s
- See also: Other events of 1845; Timeline of Chilean history

The following lists events that happened during 1845 in Chile.

== Incumbents ==
President of Chile: Manuel Bulnes

== Births ==
- date unknown - Elías Fernandez Albano
- 19 March - Ramón Allende Padín (died 1884)
- 26 April - Jorge Montt Montt
- 17 May - Pedro Lira Rencoret (died 1912)
- 13 October - Federico Santa María (died 1925)

== Deaths ==
- 16 March - Manuel Rengifo (born 1793)
