= 1846 in Chile =

- Decades: 1820s; 1830s; 1840s; 1850s; 1860s
- See also: Other events of 1846; Timeline of Chilean history

The following lists events that happened during 1846 in Chile.

== Incumbents ==
President of Chile: Manuel Bulnes

== Events ==
- 18 September – Chilean presidential election, 1846

== Births ==
- 24 March – Juan José Latorre, Vice Admiral (d. 1912)
- date unknown – Pedro Montt, president of Chile (d. 1910)

== Deaths ==
- date unknown – Mariano Egaña, lawyer and politician (b. 1793)
