= Chilean corvette Independencia =

History

United States
- Name: Curacio
- Owner: Paul Delano
- Builder: Forman Cheeseman, New York
- Cost: USD$157,000
- Launched: July 1818
- In service: 9 September 1818
- Fate: Transferred to Chile

Chile
- Name: Independencia
- Commissioned: September 1819
- Out of service: 1 April 1826
- Honours and awards: Freedom Expedition of Perú, Expedition to California (capture of Spanish San Francisco Javier, definitive capture of Chiloé)
- Fate: Sold to Argentina for $40,000

Argentina
- Name: Montevideo
- Cost: $ 40,000
- Commissioned: 1 April 1826
- Fate: Sunk in Talcahuano, refloated and sold to Peru

Peru
- Name: Independencia
- Cost: $ 40,000
- Fate: Sunk in Callao

General characteristics
- Type: Corvette
- Tons burthen: 850 tons bm
- Length: 130–138 ft (40–42 m)
- Beam: 37 ft 4 in (11.38 m)
- Draft: 18 ft (5.5 m)
- Sail plan: Full-rigged ship
- Crew: 200-256
- Armament: 26 guns

Independencia was a 26-gun corvette of the First Chilean Navy Squadron.

== Construction ==
The 851-ton ship was built in 1818 at the Forman Cheeseman Shipyard of New York City under the name Curacio for the Chilean revolutionary government. The ship was launched in July 1818 and towed from Corlear's Hook in East River to the Hudson River to continue work there. It was officially registered on the Register of Ships on 30 July 1818, with build number 203, under the ownership of American captain Paul Delano, in order to prevent confiscation under U.S. neutrality laws. The ship, still unarmed, set sail for Buenos Aires on 9 September, together with Horatio (under Captain Joseph Skinner), built in the Adam and Noah Brown shipyard under the same circumstances, and with Sachem following with their respective war materiel.

== Chilean career ==
In Buenos Aires Curacio set sail for Valparaíso, where she arrived on 23 June 1819 to be renamed Independencia and commissioned to the First Chilean Navy Squadron under the command of Captain Carlos F. Foster (also Robert Forster) and up to 1821 Wilkinson.

She was flagship of Thomas Cochrane's expedition to California in 1821. On the way she, together with Araucano, captured the Spanish brigantine corsario San Francisco Javier. She ran aground near El Realejo without heavy losses.

In summer 1822/23 she was refitted in Valparaíso and participated in the blockade of Chiloé. In 1823 she transported Jorge Beauchef and his regiment from Valdivia to Talcahuano in order to support the Putsch of Ramón Freire against Bernardo O'Higgins.

In 1826 she participated to the blockade and conquest of Chiloé under the command of Paul Delano.

== Argentine career ==
On 1 April 1826 she was sold for $40,000 to Argentina (for the war against Brazil) and renamed Montevideo, but her bad condition impeded the rounding of Cape Horn, and she sank in Talcahuano. She was refloated and sold to Peru.

== Peruvian career ==
She was sunk in Callao.
