= José del Carmen Quesada del Río =

Chilean lawyer and magistrate

José del Carmen Quesada del Río (1833-1885) was a Chilean lawyer and magistrate.

He was born in Concepción, Chile in 1833. He studied humanities at the Instituto Nacional and studied law at the university. He qualified as a lawyer on January 14, 1858. A lover of classical literature and the physical sciences and mathematics, he studied Greek and Latin under the direction of the orientalist Vendel Heyl. Established in his hometown, was appointed interim judge in April 1862. Later he settled in the city of Los Ángeles, Chile, and he became chairman of the Democratic Club (Club de la Democracia) on August 20, 1869. In 1876 he was appointed Judge of Lebu. Shortly after, he headed the judiciary in Chillán, a position he held until the day of his death in late November 1885.
