= Bernardino Bilbao Beyner =

Chilean lawyer and politician

Member of Parliament, the Republic of Chile
- In office 1823–1825
- Preceded by: Ramón Vásquez de Novoa
- Succeeded by: Juan Albano Pereira de la Cruz
- Constituency: Talca, Curepto and Lontué

Member of Parliament, the Republic of Chile
- In office 1825–1828
- Preceded by: Agustín Vial Santelices
- Succeeded by: Agustín Vial Santelices
- Constituency: Santiago

Member of Parliament, the Republic of Chile
- In office 1837–1840
- Preceded by: Pedro Antonio Acuña
- Succeeded by: Ramón Luis Irarrázaval Alcalde
- Constituency: Petorca y La Ligua

Personal details
- Born: 1788 Santiago de Chile, Viceroyalty of Peru
- Died: September 13, 1844 (aged 55–56) Chile, Valparaíso, Chile
- Citizenship: Chile
- Party: Chile Liberal Party
- Spouse: Trinidad Espinoza Plaza de los Reyes
- Occupation: Priest and Lawyer

Bernardino Bilbao Beyner (1788–1844) was a Chilean lawyer and politician. He was born in Santiago in 1788. He died in Valparaíso on September 13, 1844. He was the son of Francisco Bilbao and Doña Josefa Gonzalez Beyner Perez.

== Education ==
He studied at seminary (1800) and graduated as a lawyer with the Royal Court on December 10, 1810. He was ordained priest in 1813 and was curate of San Isidro. In 1814 he was an ecclesiastical prosecuting attorney.

== Political career ==
He was elected Member of Parliament for Talca in 1823 and 1824, for Santiago in 1825 and reelected in 1827. During these four terms he joined the Police Commission and the Institutes of Public Charity and Mercy. He was president of the House of Representatives (1825-1826).

He was again elected Member of Parliament for the Liberal Party, representing Petorca, in 1837, joining, this time, the Standing Committee on Law and Justice and the Ecclesiastical Commission. In 1841 he was canon of Mercy for the Cathedral of Santiago.
