= Melchor José Ramos =

Chilean political figure and journalist

Melchor José Ramos (January 3, 1805 – April 19, 1832, in Santiago) was a Chilean political figure and journalist. He founded El Cometa political newspaper in 1827. He died on April 19, 1832, aged 27.
