= Spanish frigate Esmeralda =

Frigate of the Spanish Navy

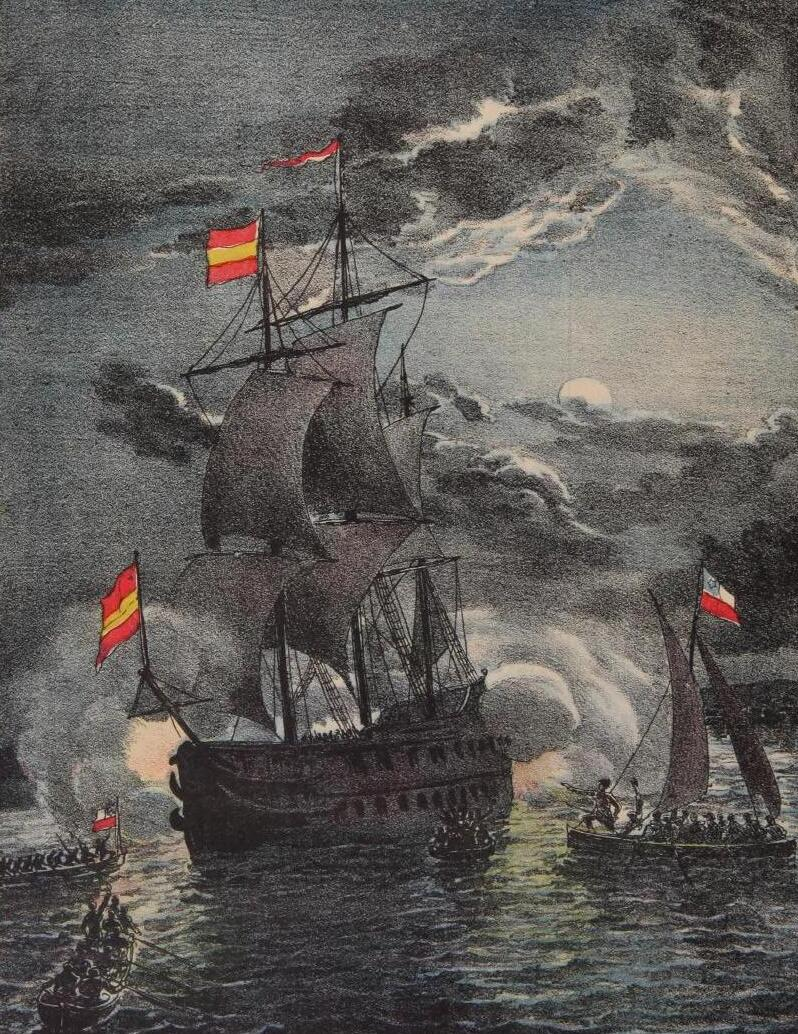
- Chilean forces capturing Esmeralda on 5 November 1820

History

Spain
- Name: Esmeralda
- Builder: Puerto Mahón, Baleares
- Launched: 1791
- Captured: 5 November 1820
- Fate: Captured in Callao by the Chilean Navy

Chile
- Name: Valdivia (15 November 1820)
- Namesake: Capture of Valdivia
- Commissioned: 6 November 1820
- Honours and awards: expedition to Acapulco after the Spanish frigate Prueba and Venganza
- Fate: Beached at Valparaíso on 10 June 1825

General characteristics
- Class & type: Frigate
- Tons burthen: 950 (bm)
- Propulsion: sail
- Armament: 40 guns

Esmeralda was a 40-gun frigate of the Spanish Navy. Built in Mahón, Menorca and launched in 1791, she was captured by the First Chilean Navy Squadron on 5 November 1820. She was renamed Valdivia in Chilean service, and was beached at Valparaíso in June 1825.

== Spanish career ==
Esmeralda was a 950 tons burthen 40-gun frigate designed by Julián de Retamosa. Built under the direction of Honorato de Bouyon y Serze in Mahón, Menorca, she was launched in 1791. In April 1793, captained by José Pascual de Bonanza, Esmeralda captured the French privateer corvette République and brought her into Alicante.

After the Spanish defeat at Chacabuco on February 1817, Esmeralda was ordered to sail from Cádiz on 6 May under Captain Luis Coig with a convoy that included the ships Reina de los Ángeles, San José, San Juan, Castilla, Tagle, and Primorosa Mariana. The convoy arrived in Callao on 30 September; Tagle had already arrived on 21 August.

On 31 March 1818, Esmeralda, the most powerful Spanish warship on the Pacific coast, joined Pezuela and Potrillo in the blockade of Valparaíso. On 27 April, Chilean ship Lautaro came alongside Esmeralda, but she made such poor contact that fewer than 20 men from Lautaro were able to get on board Esmeralda. Although the boarders were unable to capture Esmeralda, the Spanish ships abandoned the blockade.

== Chilean career ==
On the night of 5 November 1820, during the Expedition to Freeing of Perú, two silent columns of boats under command of Thomas Cochrane, 10th Earl of Dundonald entered Callao Bay and captured Esmeralda under the guns of Callao's fortifications. The demoralization of his crews helped dissipate the naval power of the Viceroy. Later, she was renamed Valdivia to commemorate Cochrane's capture of Valdivia.

The squadron was forced to move up and down the coast on supply gathering excursions, challenging shore fortifications.

As the intensity of the quarreling between San Martín and Cochrane increased, Cochrane sailed north with O'Higgins, Independencia and Valdivia in search of the last two Spanish frigates in the Pacific: Venganza and Prueba. The Chilean ships sailed as far as the Gulf of Cortez off Mexico without finding a trace of the missing frigates.

== Loss ==
On 10 June 1825 at Valparaíso, a gale from the north developed. The gale drove Esmaralda and the Chilean merchantman Valparaiso on shore. As Valparaiso was blown towards shore, her anchor hooked and broke the chains of the brig Calder, with the result that Calder too wrecked on shore.

== Post-script ==
Valdivia's keel became fixed in the sand. The ship was unsalvageable and was filled with sand so that she could be used as Valparaíso's first pier for passengers and light cargo. The area where she rested was later filled in with rubble, burying her. The area is now the Sotomayor Square.
