= Liberating Expedition of Peru =

1820–22 anti-Spanish expedition in South America

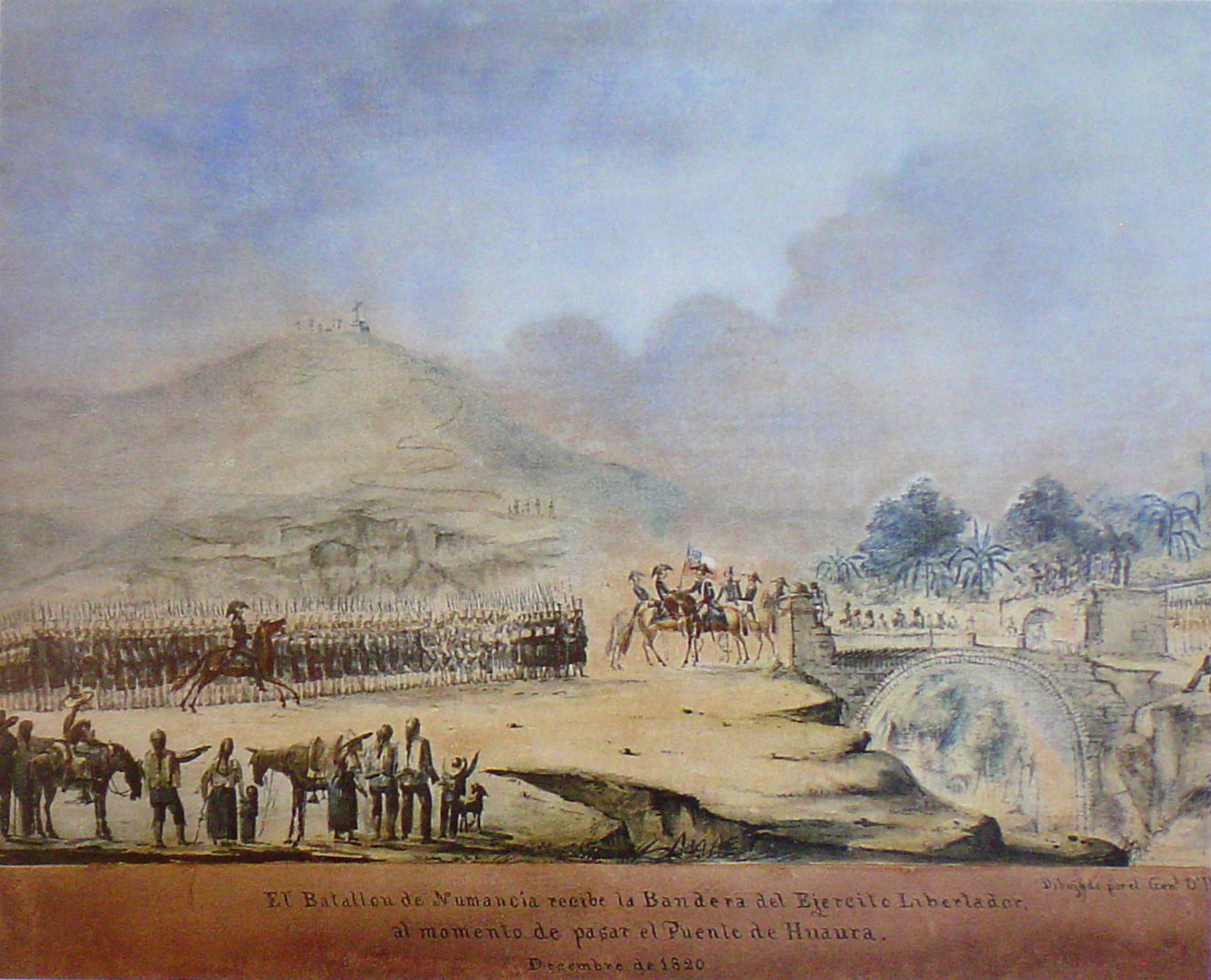
- Active: 1820–1824
- Allegiance: Chile: United Provinces of the Rio de la Plata
- Type: Military forces
- Role: Battle
- Engagements: Spanish American wars of independence
- Battle honours: Liberation of Lima and the coastal area of Peru. Proclamation the independence of Peru

Commanders
- Army Commander: José de San Martín
- Fleet Commander: Thomas Cochrane

Insignia
- Identification symbol

The Liberating Expedition of Peru (Spanish: Expedición Libertadora del Perú) was a naval and land military force created in 1820 by the government of Chile in continuation of the plan of the Argentine General José de San Martín to achieve the independence of Peru, and thus consolidate the independence of all former Spanish-American colonies. It was vital to defeat the Viceroyalty of Peru—the center of royalist power in South America—from where royalist expeditions were sent to reconquer the territories lost to the independence fighters.

Following the independence of Chile, achieved at the Battle of Maipú, General San Martín determined to achieve the independence of Peru. Accordingly, on February 5, 1819, a treaty was signed between the new Republic of Chile and the United Provinces of the Río de la Plata. The treaty was to create an amphibious, naval, and land military expeditionary force promoted by the government of Chile, with the mission of making Peru independent of the Spanish Empire and consolidating both the sovereignty of the new Republic of Chile and that of the United Provinces of the Río de la Plata, which became Argentina.

The parties to the treaty faced ongoing problems which hampered the launch of their liberating campaign. Chile was under imminent threat of further Spanish invasions, while the United Provinces of the Río de la Plata were in turmoil over internal disputes. It was finally negotiated that the bulk of the effort and initial cost would essentially fall on the Government of Chile, and then the costs expended were to be borne by the future independent government of Peru. Bernardo O'Higgins, as Supreme Director of Chile, appointed José de San Martín chief of the United Liberation Army of Chile and the former British Naval officer, the Scot, Thomas, Lord Cochrane, commander of the naval fleet. In this way, the Liberating Army of Peru, thus named by supreme decree of the Congress of Chile, on May 19, 1820, was a combined force of units of the restored Chilean Army along with those elements belonging to the Liberating Army of the Andes, that had fought in the Peruvian War of Independence.

The rebellion of Rafael del Riego of 1820 in Spain, made the threat of Spanish invasion of the Río de la Plata recede. The vice-admiral, Lord Cochrane, would succeed in sweeping away the remnants of Spanish naval power in the Pacific Ocean. These events allowed the land forces of General San Martín to embark in Valparaíso, disembark at Paracas Bay on September 8, occupy the city of Lima, and proclaim the independence of Peru on July 28, 1821.

The expedition liberated parts of Peru from Spanish Crown control. It would participate in the expeditions of Juan Antonio Álvarez de Arenales in the highlands of Peru and the campaigns of intermediate ports, and would remain in Peru until its dissolution with the mutiny of 1824 at the second siege of Callao.

The expedition was not successful in conquering the whole of Peru, and suffered several defeats against the Royalists in the highlands. The end of the war would only come with the military intervention of Gran Colombia. Following the self exile of San Martin in September 1822, and the military defeats under president José de la Riva Agüero, the congress decided to send a plea in 1823 for the help of Simón Bolívar.

One Squadron of Mounted Grenadiers Regiment, the sole remnants of the expeditionary force, were added to the units of the Army of Peru and the United Liberation Army of Peru, under the command of Simón Bolívar, which would complete the liberation of Peru in 1824-26.

== Maitland Plan ==
According to Argentine historians like Felipe Pigna and Rodolfo Terragno, José de San Martín was introduced to the plan during his stay in London in 1811 by members of the Logia Lautaro: a Freemasonic Lodge founded by Francisco de Miranda and Scottish Lord MacDuff (James Duff, 4th Earl Fife). San Martín was allegedly part of the lodge, and he took the Maitland Plan as a blueprint for the movements necessary to defeat the Spanish army in Chile and Peru; he carried on successfully with the last five points of the plan, and thus liberated the southern part of the continent.

== Background ==
Between 1812 and 1814 the General Captaincy of Chile was reconquered by José Fernando de Abascal y Sousa, Viceroy of Perú, which ended in the Disaster of Rancagua, putting an end to the Patria Vieja (Old Homeland) period, in which the Chilean patriots had governed the majority of the colony and formulated notable reforms to the colonial Spanish diet. After the disaster, the Chilean troops, along with the representatives of the government, fled to Mendoza, where they were received by the governor of the province of Cuyo, General José de San Martín, who then concocted a plan of liberation of the South American colonies of the Spanish Empire. The plan would consist of invading Chile with an army composed largely of the remains of the Army of Chile, defeated in Rancagua, as well as Argentine troops. After the invasion and liberation of Chile, they would embark by sea to Peru to eliminate the Spanish presence in that region, since they were considered a big threat for the independence of other Latin Americans countries.

The emancipation of Perú was to have been a common enterprise by Chile and Argentina. Argentina, then a loose alliance of provinces, distracted by internal strife and another threat of invasion from Spain, was unable to contribute for the expedition and ordered José de San Martín back to Argentina. San Martín choose to disobey (see Acta de Rancagua) and O'Higgins decided that Chile would assume the costs of the Freedom Expedition of Perú.

== The Squadron ==
On 20 August 1820 the expedition sailed from Valparaíso for Paracas, near Pisco in Perú. The escort was provided by the squadron and consisted of the flagship O'Higgins (under Captain Thomas Sackville Crosbie), frigate San Martín (Captain William Wilkinson), frigate Lautaro (Captain Martin Guise), the corvette Independencia (Captain Robert Forster), the brigs Galvarino (Captain John Tooker Spry), Araucano (Captain Thomas Carter), and Pueyrredón (Lieutenant William Prunier) and the schooner Moctezuma (Lieutenant George Young).

Every expeditionary ship got a painted number so that it could be identified at a distance. There are discrepancies between authors about the names and number and some names of the transports.

List of transporters of the Expedition to Perú
Ship name	Ship number	tons	Other names	troops	personnel or cargo
Potrillo (Note: Property of Thomas Cochrane, hired out to Chile, Brian Vale, Cochrane in the Pacific, page 144)	20	180		0	1400 boxes of munitions for infantry and artillery, 190 boxes munitions for flamethrowerfor and 8 barrels powder
Consecuencia	11	550	Argentina	561	
Gaditana	10	250		236	6 guns
Emprendedora	12	325	Empresa	319	1280 boxes musket balls, 1500 boxes supplies of tools and repair shop
Golondrina	19	120		0	100 boxes munition, 190 boxes clothes, 460 sack kekse, 670 bunches jerked beef
Peruana	18	250		53	hospital, physicians and 200 boxes
Jerezana	15	350		461	
Minerva	8	325		630	
Águila	14	800	not Brigantine Pueyrredón	752	7 guns
Dolores	9	400		395	
Mackenna	?	500		0	960 boxes with weapons, armors and leather goods for infantry and cavalry. 180 quintal iron pieces
Perla	16	350		140	6 guns
Santa Rosa	13	240	Santa Rosa de Chacabuco or Chacabuco	372	6 guns
Nancy	21	200		0	80 horses and fodder

On 8 September 1820 the liberating army disembarked 100 miles southeast of Lima: of the 4118 soldiers, 4000 of them were Chileans.

On the night of 5 November, Cochrane personally and 240 volunteers wearing white with blue armbands captured the Spanish frigate Esmeralda within the port of Callao. She was renamed Valdivia and commissioned into the Chilean Navy.

== Callao uprising and dissolution of the Andes division ==
In 1824, during Bolívar's campaign in Peru, the Andes Division replaced the Colombian forces as the garrison of the Real Felipe Fortress. On 5 February 1824, this garrison of the Callao castle (Real Felipe) rose in mutiny. The mutineers, some 2,000 combatants—essentially the Río de la Plata regiment, the 11th Andes regiment, and other auxiliary units, including the Chile Battalion No. 4, the Chilean artillery brigade, and the Peruvian flying artillery brigade, all led by sergeant major Dámaso Moyano, cited rationing and unpaid wages as their motives, and took their officers prisoner. On 10 February, they raised the Spanish flag over the Callao fortresses, defecting to the Spanish forces and placing in command a colonel of the Talavera battalion, José María Casariego, a veteran of the campaigns in Chile.

The Callao garrison was eventually formed into a Spanish infantry regiment, which the royalists renamed La Lealtad or Real Felipe, and Moyano was made a colonel. On 14 February, two squadrons of horse grenadiers—just over 200 riders under Orellano—joined the mutiny from Cañete. However, one squadron of horse grenadiers, about 80 riders, remained with Bolívar's army until the battle of Ayacucho, after which it was returned, arriving in Buenos Aires on 17 January 1825. The Callao insurgents continued fighting as part of the royalist forces until their capitulation in 1826.
