= Chilean frigate O'Higgins =

Coordinates: 56.181°S 67.035°W

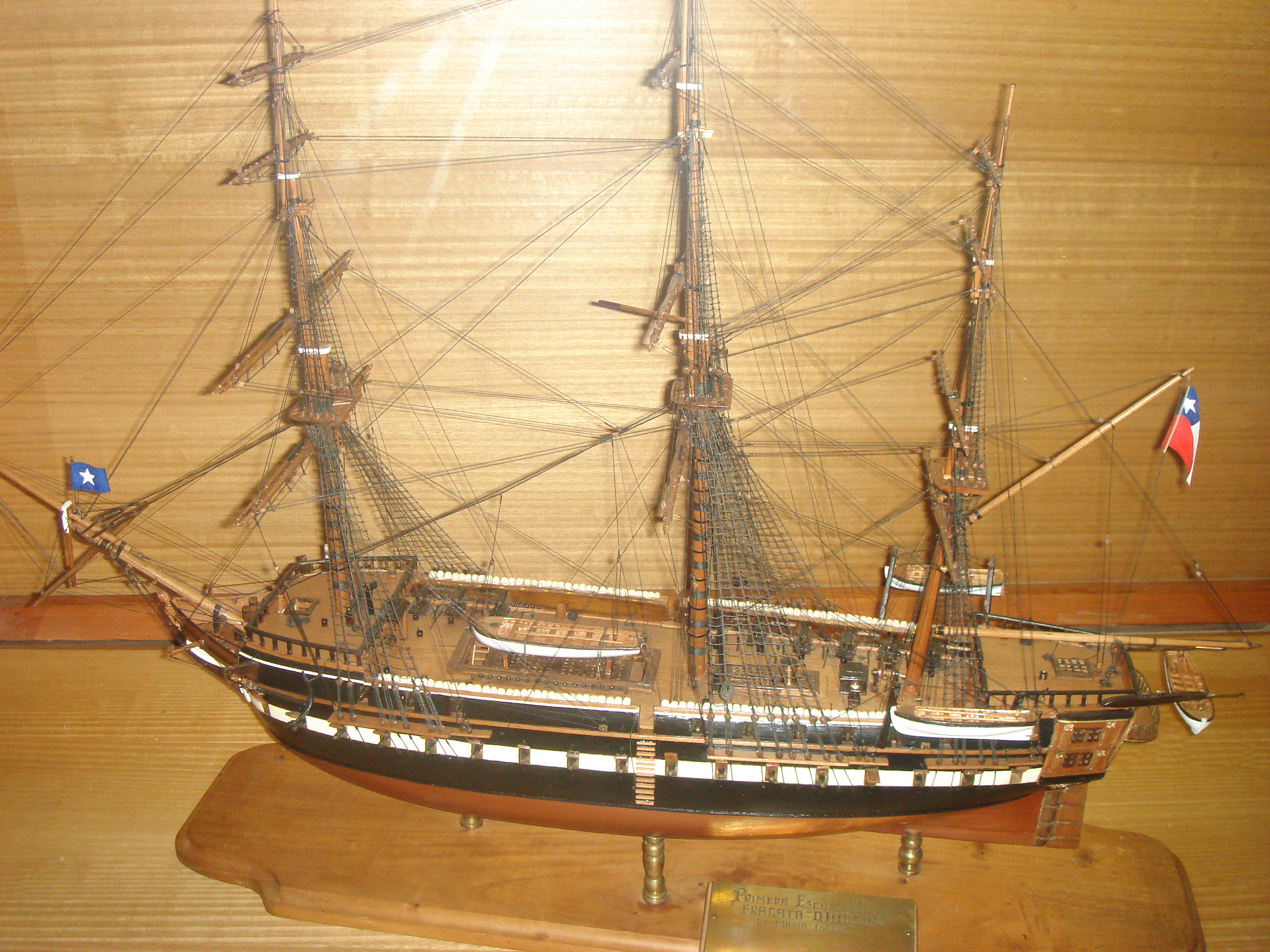
- Model of the frigate O'Higgins from the Museo Naval y Marítimo of the Chilean Navy

History

Russia
- Name: Patrikii
- Builder: Solombala Shipyard, Arkhangelsk
- Launched: 3 July 1816
- Fate: Sold to Spain

Spain
- Name: María Isabel
- Acquired: 17 August 1817
- Captured: 20 October 1818
- Fate: Captured by Chile in Talcahuano

Chile
- Name: O'Higgins
- Namesake: Bernardo O'Higgins
- Commissioned: October 1818
- Renamed: María Isabel (1823)
- Fate: Sold to Argentina

Argentina
- Name: Buenos Aires
- Namesake: Buenos Aires
- Commissioned: 1826
- Fate: Sank 1826

General characteristics
- Class & type: Speshniy-class frigate
- Tons burthen: 1220 (bm)
- Length: 48.6 m (159 ft 5 in)
- Beam: 12.7 m (41 ft 8 in)
- Draft: 3.9 m (12 ft 10 in)
- Propulsion: Sail
- Crew: 288-430 men
- Armament: 40-50 guns

O'Higgins was a Chilean frigate famous for her actions under Captain Lord Cochrane.

== Russian career ==
The ship was launched in Russia in 1816, as the Speshni-class frigate Patrikii ("Патрикий"). To save time and money, the Russians built her of pine and larch. In 1817 the Russians sold her to Spain, which renamed her María Isabel.

== Spanish career ==
In 1818 María Isabel sailed under Captain Dionisio Capas with a convoy to the coast of Peru. There the First Chilean Navy Squadron, under the command of Manuel Blanco Encalada, captured her at Talcahuano.

== Chilean career ==
The Chileans renamed the ship O'Higgins after Bernardo O'Higgins, the South American Independence leader and first Chilean head of state.

O'Higgins was Thomas Cochrane's flagship when he commanded the Chilean navy during the Freedom Expedition of Perú.

When San Martín was wrecked in the bay of Chorrilos, Peru, in July 1821, Cochrane shifted his flag from San Martín back to O'Higgins.

Cochrane also sailed O'Higgins to Acapulco.

On 8 June 1823, O'Higgins suffered severe damage when she collided with the Chilean ship Lautaro in the Bay of Paraíso during a gale.

During 1823, after a conservative coup on 28 January 1823 deposed O'Higgins, the new government under Ramón Freire renamed the frigate María Isabel again.

== Argentine career ==
She was sold to Argentina on 1 April 1826 and refitted in Valparaíso and renamed Buenos Aires, but she never reached Buenos Aires. She sank rounding Cape Horn.

== See also ==
- List of decommissioned ships of the Chilean Navy
