= Mañil =

Mapuche chieftain

Mapuche leader
- Succeeded by: Quilapán

Military service
- Battles/wars: Chilean War of Independence: Guerra a muerte; Chilean Civil War of 1851: Battle of Loncomilla; Chilean Civil War of 1859 Occupation of Araucanía

Mañil or Magnil was a Mapuche lonko who fought in the 1851 Chilean Revolution and led an uprising in 1859. He was the main chief of the Arribanos and the father of Quilapán who led Mapuche forces in the Occupation of Araucanía.

Mañil had a long-running enmity with lonko Juan Lorenzo Colipí dating back to their participation in the Guerra a muerte (1819–1821) phase of the Chilean War of Independence. In 1834 and 1835 he survived a large malón by Colipí and was later able to rebuild his forces. When Colipí died in 1850 it was said he had been poisoned by Mañil's men. In 1852 Mañil had two of Colipí's sons, among them his heir Pedro Colipí, killed.

Manuel Montt, as President of Chile, passed a law on December 7 of 1852 that created the Province of Arauco, a territory intended to administer all territories south of the Bío-Bío River and north of Valdivia Province. In a letter to Manuel Montt Mañil denounced the plunder of graves in search of Mapuche silver, arson of Mapuche houses and other abuses against Mapuches that were happening in the newly created province. Mañil further accused intendant Villalón con Salbo of becoming rich by cattle theft.

The encroachment over time of settlers advancing from the north across Bío Bío River into Mapuche territory and the appearance of German settlers in the south of the Mapuche territory led chief Mañil in 1859 to call for an uprising to assert control over the territory. Most Mapuches responded to the call, except the communities at Purén, Choll Choll, and the southern coastal Mapuches who had strong links with Valdivia. The towns of Angol, Negrete and Nacimiento were attacked. A peace proposal made by settlers was accepted in 1860 during a meeting of several Mapuche chiefs. The agreement established that land transfers could only be made with the approval of the chiefs.

The 1859 uprising reinforced the Chilean view of Mapuches as a dangerous threat to the emerging settlements in Araucanía and influenced public opinion in Chile to push for the complete incorporation of Araucanía into Chile. These events contributed to the Chilean authorities' decision of occupying Araucanía.

== Bibliography ==
- Bengoa, José (2000). Historia del pueblo mapuche: Siglos XIX y XX (Seventh ed.). LOM Ediciones. ISBN 956-282-232-X.
- Cayuqueo, Pedro (2020). Historia secreta mapuche 2. Santiago de Chile: Catalonia. ISBN 978-956-324-783-1.
- Ferrando Kaun, Ricardo (1986). Y así nació La Frontera... (Second ed.). Editorial Antártica. ISBN 978-956-7019-83-0.
- Villalobos R., Sergio; Silva G., Osvaldo; Silva V., Fernando; Estelle M., Patricio (1974). Historia de Chile (1995 ed.). Editorial Universitaria. ISBN 956-11-1163-2.
