= Occupation of Araucanía =

Incorporation of Araucanía into Chile

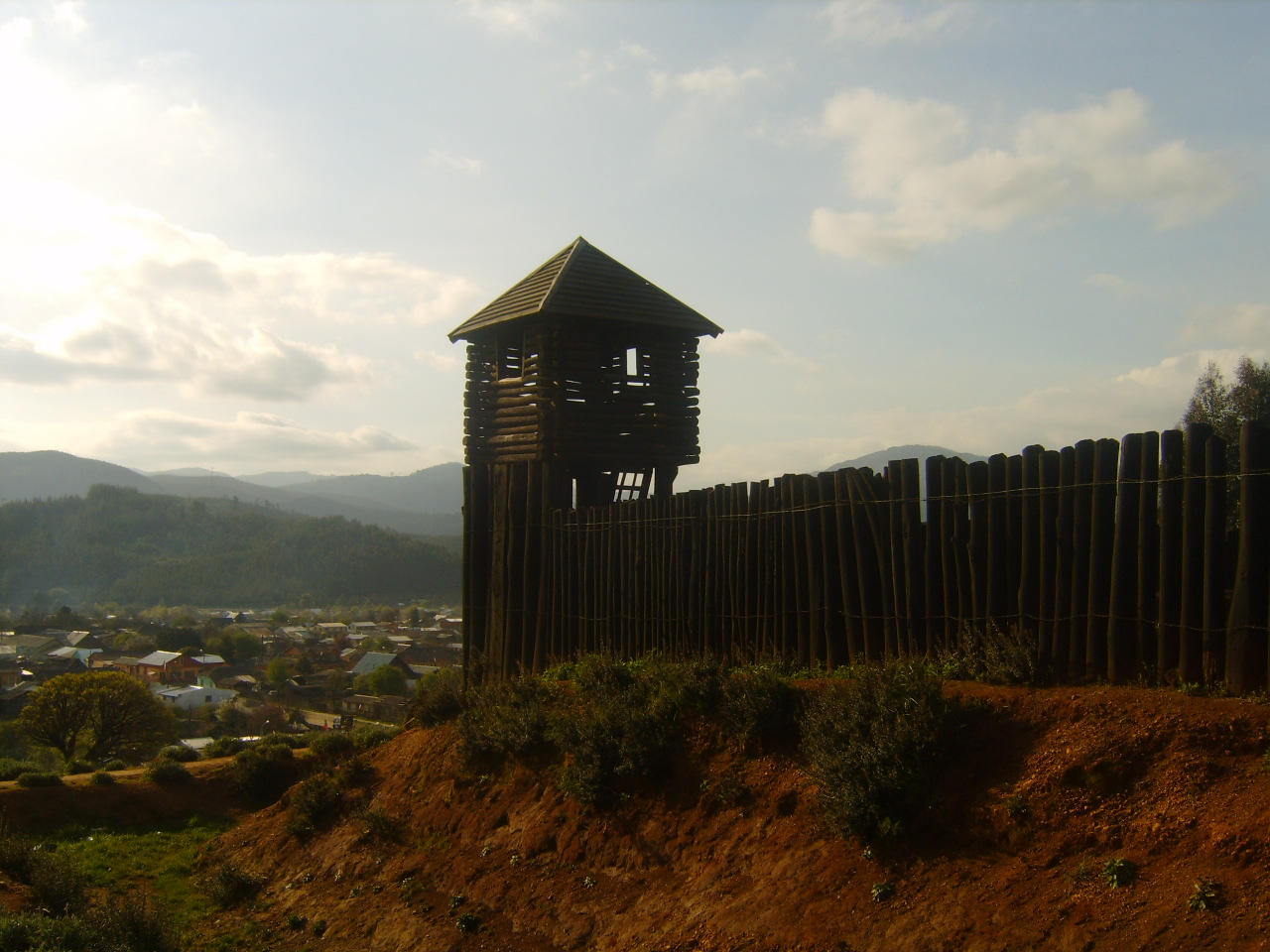
View of a modern reconstruction of the Fort of Purén built during the occupation

The Occupation of Araucanía or Pacification of Araucanía (1861–1883) was a series of military campaigns, agreements and penetrations by the Chilean military and settlers into Mapuche territory which led to the incorporation of Araucanía into Chilean national territory. Pacification of Araucanía was the expression used by the Chilean authorities for this process. The conflict was concurrent with Argentine campaigns against the Mapuche (1878–1885) aimed at establishing dominance over Patagonia and Chile's wars with Spain (1865–1866) and with Peru and Bolivia (1879–1883).

The Mapuche people had a history of resistance to Spanish conquest with the area known as Araucanía remaining de facto independent through the colonial era. Following Chile's War of Independence against the Spanish Empire, relations between the nascent republic and the Mapuches of Araucanía remained mostly amicable. However economic and geopolitical reasons together with increasingly negative attitudes towards the Mapuche made Chilean authorities decide to seek an incorporation of Araucanía, by force if necessary. The Mapuche chiefdoms responded in different ways, some aligned with the central government, a substantial number followed the lead of the Arribanos in violently opposing the advance of Chilean settlers and soldiers into the region, while some others opted for neutrality. For the first ten years (1861−1871), the Mapuches were unable to prevent Chile from advancing its positions but at time were able to defeat in detail small detachments while avoiding large battles. Hostilities were minimal in the decade that followed, this period was mostly peaceful but ended when the Mapuches were unable to militarily oppose a large Chilean army that in March 1881 penetrated from the north to Cautín River, putting most of the territory under Chilean rule or at least occupation. In November 1881, the Mapuches made a last-ditch effort to regain control of their territory, launching coordinated strikes against Chilean settlements across the region. With most of these attacks repelled and Mapuche forces defeated within a matter of days, Chile went on to consolidate its conquests in the years that followed.

The conflict led to the deaths of thousands of Mapuche by warfare and disease, primarily smallpox. Many Mapuches faced hardship from the widespread pillaging of the Chilean army, bandits and inability to cultivate. Disruption of the Mapuche economy was further aggravated by having their lands reduced plunging many into poverty that has persisted for generations.

== Background ==
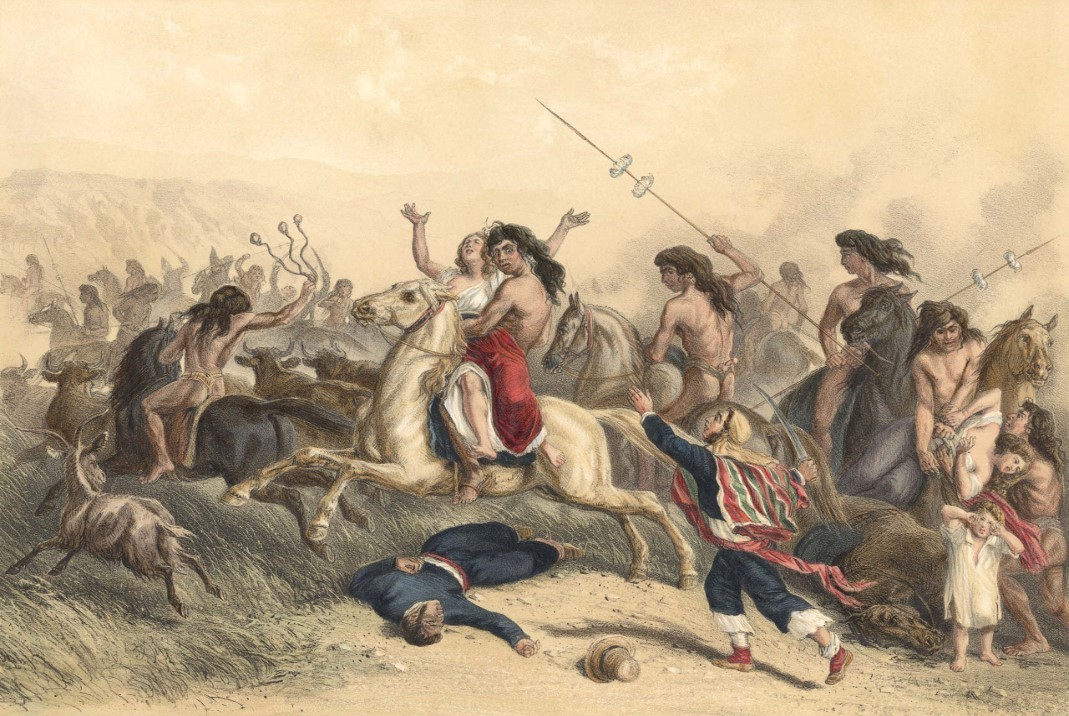
Mapuches during a malón raid

Beginning in the second half of the 18th century Mapuche-Spanish and later Mapuche-Chilean trade increased and hostilities decreased. Mapuches obtained goods from Chile and some dressed in "Spanish" clothing. Despite close contacts Chileans and Mapuches remained socially, politically and economically distinct. During Chile's first fifty years of independence (1810–1860) the government's relationship with the Araucanía territory was not a priority and the Chilean government prioritized the development of Central Chile over its relationship with indigenous groups.

Domingo Faustino Sarmiento stated:

Between two Chilean provinces (Concepción and Valdivia) there is a piece of land that is not a province, its language is different, it is inhabited by other people and it can still be said that it is not part of Chile. Yes, Chile is the name of the country over where its flag waves and its laws are obeyed.

=== Expansion of Chilean agriculture ===
The Chilean agricultural sector was badly affected by the Chilean War of Independence. Following the Chilean silver rush that began in 1832, agriculture expanded in the Norte Chico. The next major expansion of agricultural activity occurred from 1848 onwards as a result of wheat demand during the colonization of Australia and the California Gold Rush. Despite the eventual vanishing of the Californian and Australian markets, wheat cultivation remained highly profitable. In the 1850s, with the German colonization of Valdivia, Osorno and Llanquihue and the onset of sheep farming in the Chilean territory at the Strait of Magellan, Araucanía remained the sole place for agriculture to expand.

Mapuche lands around the south of the Bío-Bío River began to be bought by non-Mapuches in the late 18th century, and by 1860 land between Bío-Bío and Malleco River was mostly under control of Chileans. The Chilean wheat boom increased pressure to acquire lands in Araucanía by Chileans and led to numerous scams and frauds against Mapuches. A limited number of speculators obtained control over vast lands through frauds and maintained control over their assets with the aid of gunmen.

A contrast appeared: while the Chilean economy had a booming agricultural sector, a large part of the Mapuche economy revolved around livestock operations in one of the largest territories any indigenous group had ever possessed in South America.

=== Shipwreck of Joven Daniel ===
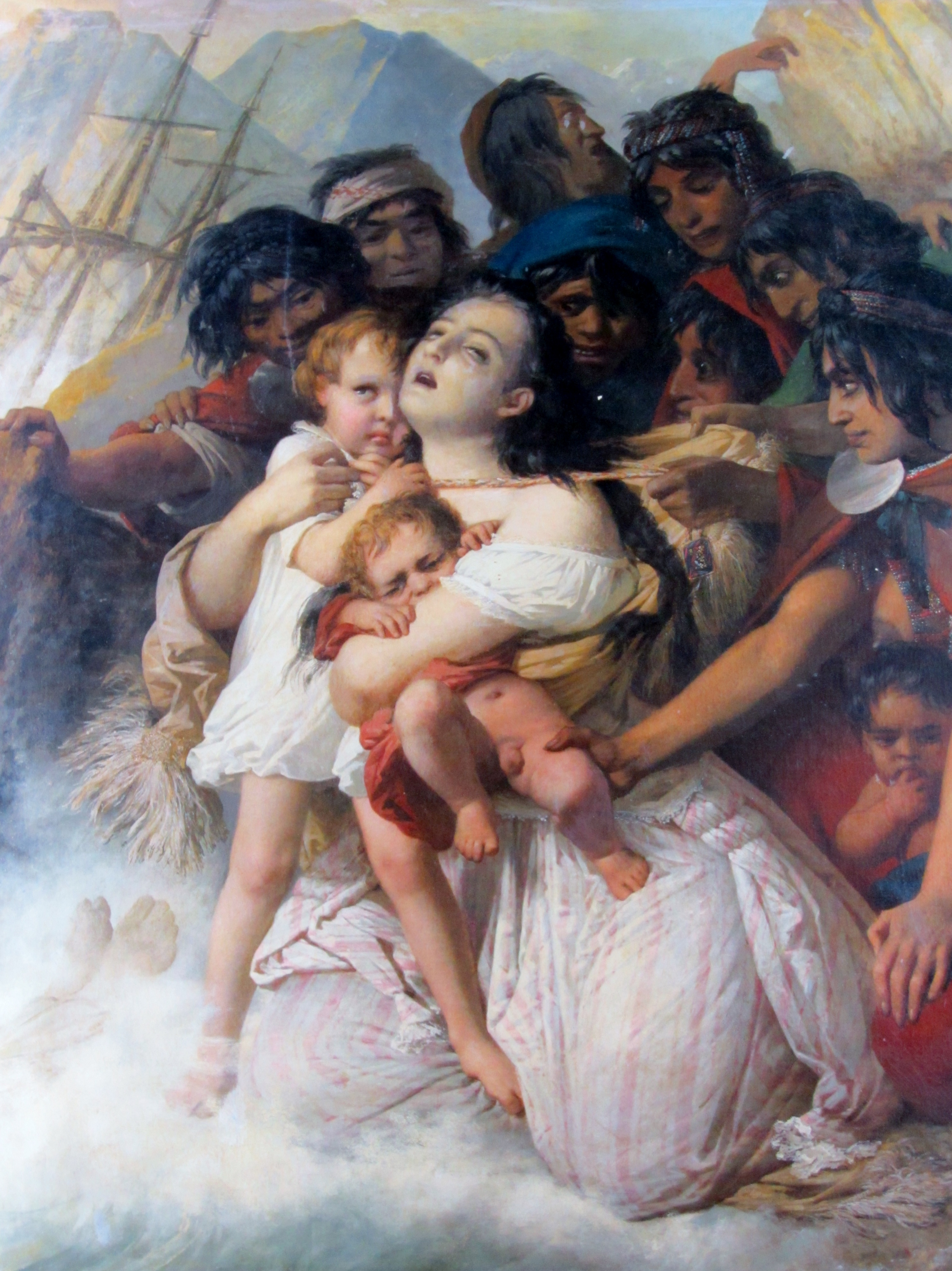
Painting showing Elisa Bravo Jaramillo, who was said to have survived the wreck of Joven Daniel to be then kidnapped by Mapuches

In 1849 a ship travelling between Valdivia and Valparaíso, Joven Daniel, was wrecked at the coast between the mouths of Imperial and Toltén River. The shipwreck was looted by a local Mapuche tribe and some of the survivors were killed. These events became first known in Valdivia and later in Santiago where they fuelled a strong anti-Mapuche sentiment and reaffirmed prejudiced views that the Mapuches were brutal barbarians. President Manuel Bulnes's opposition called for a punitive expedition and Mapuches prepared for a confrontation with the Chilean Army. Bulnes however dismissed the calls for a punitive expedition in view of its irrelevance to the eventual conquest of Araucanía.

=== 1851 revolution ===
When Chilean liberals began the 1851 Revolution Mapuche chief Mañil joined the rebel army and fought with José María de la Cruz's army against the troops of Manuel Bulnes at the Battle of Loncomilla. After defeat at Loncomilla Mañil returned south. According to historian José Bengoa Mapuches saw the government in Santiago as their main enemy, explaining thus the participation of Mapuches on the side of José María de la Cruz Concepción-based revolt.

=== 1859 uprising ===
The encroachment over time of settlers advancing from the north across Bío Bío River into Mapuche territory and the appearance of German settlers in the south of the Mapuche territory led chief Mañil in 1859 to call for an uprising to assert control over the territory. Most Mapuches responded to the call, except the communities at Purén, Choll Choll, and the southern coastal Mapuches who had strong links with Valdivia. The towns of Angol, Negrete and Nacimiento were attacked. A peace proposal made by settlers was accepted in 1860 during a meeting of several Mapuche chiefs. The agreement established that land transfers could only be made with the approval of the chiefs.

The 1859 uprising reinforced the Chilean view of Mapuches as a dangerous threat to the emerging settlements in Araucanía and influenced public opinion in Chile to push for the complete incorporation of Araucanía into Chile. These events contributed to the Chilean authorities' decision of occupying Araucanía.

== Planning of the occupation ==
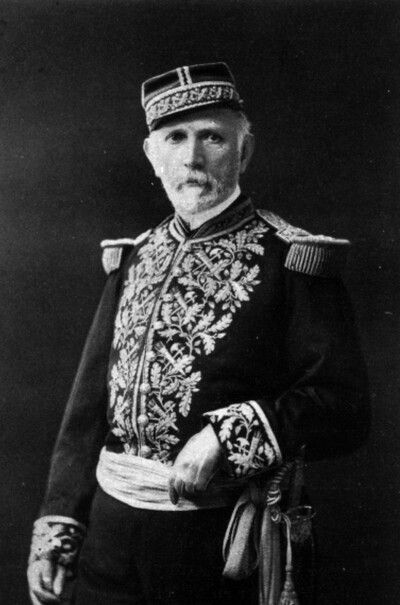
Photo of Cornelio Saavedra Rodríguez, the planner and military leader of the occupation until 1871

In 1823, Chilean minister Mariano Egaña had a project approved by Congress to colonize the territory between Imperial River and Bío Bío River, establishing a series of forts on the northern shores of Imperial and Cautín Rivers in the middle of Araucanía. Chilean president Ramón Freire adopted the project initially but was later convinced to focus instead on the expulsion of the Spanish from Chiloé Archipelago, leaving the Araucanía issue pending.

In 1849, Chilean minister Antonio Varas delivered a report to the Chilean congress analyzing the situation in Araucanía. In his report, Varas recommended that a government regime distinct from the rest of the country should be designed for an eventual incorporation of Araucanía. Varas expressed the view that the eventual mission was to be to civilize the indigenous inhabitants by increasing their material standard of living and "raise their spirit to the moral and religious truths".

Manuel Montt, as President of Chile, passed a law on 7 December 1852, that created the province of Arauco, a territory intended to administer all territories south of the Bío-Bío River and north of Valdivia Province. In a letter to Manuel Montt Mapuche chief Mañil denounced the plunder of graves in search of Mapuche silver, arson of Mapuche houses and other abuses against Mapuches that were happening in the newly created province. Mañil further accused intendant Villalón con Salbo of becoming rich by cattle theft.

The final planning of the occupation of Araucanía can be largely attributed to Colonel Cornelio Saavedra Rodríguez. The plan outlined by Saavedra envisaged a state-led colonization influenced by the developments of the United States frontier in sharp contrast to the old private enterprise-led Spanish colonization of Chile. The plan included the following points:

1. The advancement of the Chilean Army to Malleco River and the establishment there of a defensive line.
2. The subdivision of state land in plots and transfer of state titles of land in the territory between Malleco and Bío Bío River to privates.
3. The colonization of Araucanía by Chilean and foreign settlers, gathering foreign settlers of different nationalities in particular locations to ease their assimilation.
4. Indigenous peoples were to "enter into reduction and civilization".

== Occupation ==
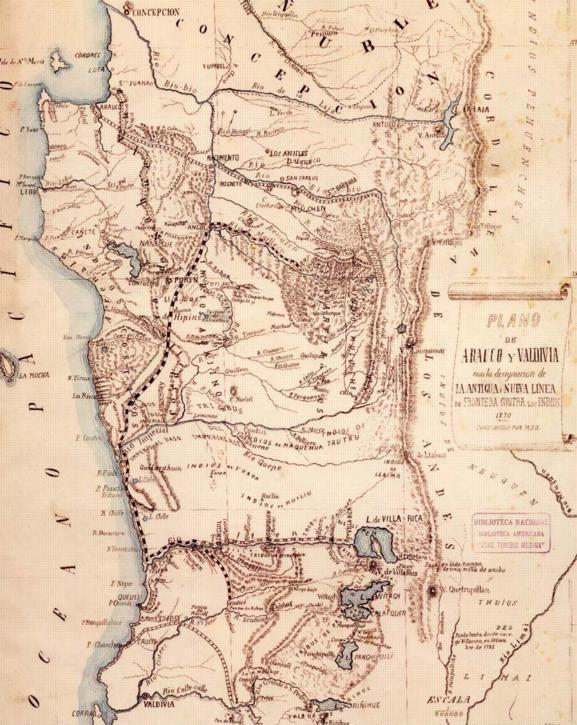
Map showing the "old" and the "new" frontier established by 1870

=== Chilean advance to Malleco (1861–62) ===
In 1861 Cornelio Saavedra Rodríguez ordered major Pedro Lagos to advance into the confluence of Mulchén River with Bureo River. A small fort was erected at the site between December 1861 and May 1862 after the local Mapuche chief Manuel Nampai handed over the land. From this fort the town of Mulchén grew. Following a custom inherited from colonial times, Saavedra assigned salaries to friendly Mapuche chiefs in zones of Mulchén.

Cornelio Saavedra attempted to pressure the Chilean government to approve his plans by presenting his renounce in December 1861 and again in February 1862.

In 1862 Saavedra advanced with a group of 800 soldiers into the remnants of the town of Angol while other troops reinforced the defenses of Los Ángeles, Negrete, Nacimiento and Mulchén. An eventual defense of Purén and Santa Bárbara was to be made by groups of civilians.

=== Mapuche response and Chilean coastal advance (1863–1868) ===
Saavedra retired from the army in January 1864 after political pressures from the ministers of President José Joaquín Pérez. The Chincha Islands War between Spain and an alliance between Chile and Peru made the government call Saavedra into the army again in 1866 in order to defend the coast of Araucanía against possible Spanish attacks. Saavedra ordered a fort to be constructed in the coast between Lebu and Imperial River. The government also granted Saavedra three steam ships to scout the coast. In December 1866 the coastal locality of Queule was occupied by Chilean troops.

In response to the Chilean advances, the Arribanos decided to go to war while the Lafquenches of Budi Lake, Toltén and Queule had a meeting where they declared themselves neutral in the conflict but still loyal to the Chilean government. The Pehuenches did also declare themselves neutral. The Pehuenche chief Pichiñán is reported to have spoken against the Moluches, who wanted war, claiming that they engaged in robbery and received for that just punishments by Chileans. Historian José Bengoa claims Pehuenche neutrality was indebted to the fact that their lands in the Andes were not subject to colonization. Nevertheless, the Pehuenches ended up aiding the Arribanos by providing access to cattle from the Pampas.

In 1867 Saavedra called the Mapuches to a "parliament" where he informed them of the Chilean decision of fortifying the Malleco River line. The parliament was attended by around thousand Abajinos. The Arribanos gathered around 2000 men near the parliament but refused to attend unless the Chileans sent some men as hostages. Despite this incident the a parliament was held the next day. Mapuches are reported to have been infuriated when they discovered the plans of Saavedra and that Mapuche chief Nahueltripai had allowed the Chileans to establish forts in his lands.

These events lead to the formation of an alliance between the northern Abajinos and the Arribanos.

=== Second Chilean campaign (April 1868 – March 1869) ===
As the Mapuches prepared for war many moved their families to safe sites south of Cautín River (according to El Mercurio de Valparaíso) or to Lonquimay (according to El Ferrocarril). The Abajino chiefs Catrileo and Pinolevi who had close ties with the Chilean government refused to join the Abajino-Arribano alliance and were in 1868 killed in a malón directed at them.

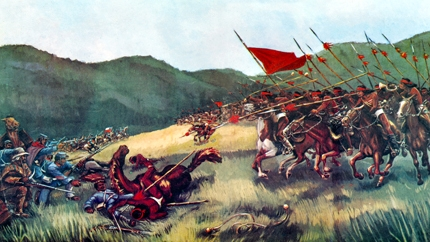
Painting of the Mapuche cavalry charge at Quecherehuas

In 1868 the Arribano chief Quilapán, son of Mañil, attacked a Chilean outpost at Chihuaihue. A group of Chileans led by Pedro Lagos came under attack while moving to Quechereguas. Yet another party of Mapuches defeated a Chilean Army group killing 23 of 28 soldiers. In response to the initial failure commandant José Manuel Pinto launched a scorched earth strategy in Mapuche lands in the summer of 1869. In these incursions by the Chilean Armies houses and crop fields were looted and more than 2 million livestock animals stolen from Mapuches. Part of the Mapuche civil population, including women and children, were either killed or held captive. In addition to the pillaging by the Chilean Army, bandits looted Mapuche property with consent of Chilean authorities. The Mapuches refused to engage in battles allowing the Chilean armies cross all over their territory. The differences in war materiel between Mapuches and the Chilean Army was huge, while Chileans used repeating rifles Mapuches had few firearms and used bolas, spears and slings.

The war provoked a famine among Mapuches in the winter of 1869, with the situation being worsened by a smallpox epidemic. Some Mapuches sold their few remaining livestock and their silver adornments in the towns of La Frontera to obtain food.

=== Parliaments of Toltén and Ipilco (December 1869 – January 1870) ===
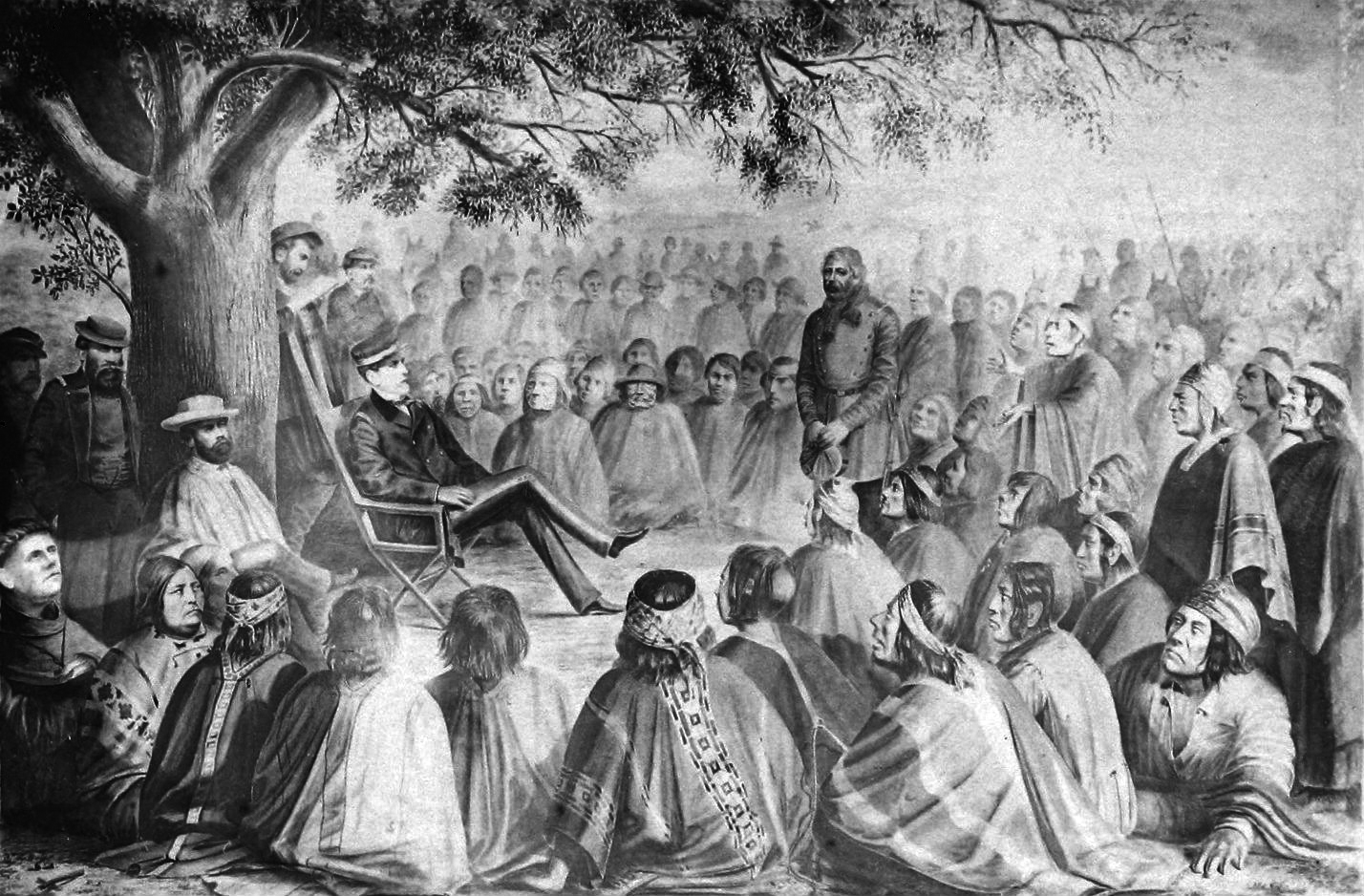
Cornelio Saavedra Rodríguez in a meeting with some of the main lonkos of Araucania in 1869

In late 1869 and early 1870 Saavedra arranged two parliaments; one at Toltén and another at Ipinco. At Toltén Saavedra attempted to make agreements with the southern chiefs in order to isolate Quilapán. The chiefs attending the meeting could not agree on whether Saavedra should be allowed to establish a town in southern Araucanía or not. At Toltén Mapuche chiefs revealed to Saavedra that Orélie-Antoine de Tounens was once again at Araucanía. Upon hearing that his presence in Araucanía had been revealed Orélie-Antoine de Tounens fled to Argentina, having however promised Quilapán to obtain arms. There are some reports that a shipment of arms seized by Argentine authorities at Buenos Aires in 1871 were ordered by Orélie-Antoine de Tounens. A French battleship, d'Entrecasteaux, that anchored in 1870 at Corral drew suspicions from Saavedra of some sort of French interference. Accordingly, there may have been substance to these fears as information given to Abdón Cifuentes in 1870 an intervention in favour of the Kingdom of Araucanía and Patagonia against Chile was discussed in Napoleon III's Conseil d'État.

At the parliament of Ipinco the Abajinos rejected all the points proposed by Saavedra. The parliament did nevertheless serve to weaken the Abajino–Arribano alliance.

=== Declared war (May 1870 – March 1871) ===
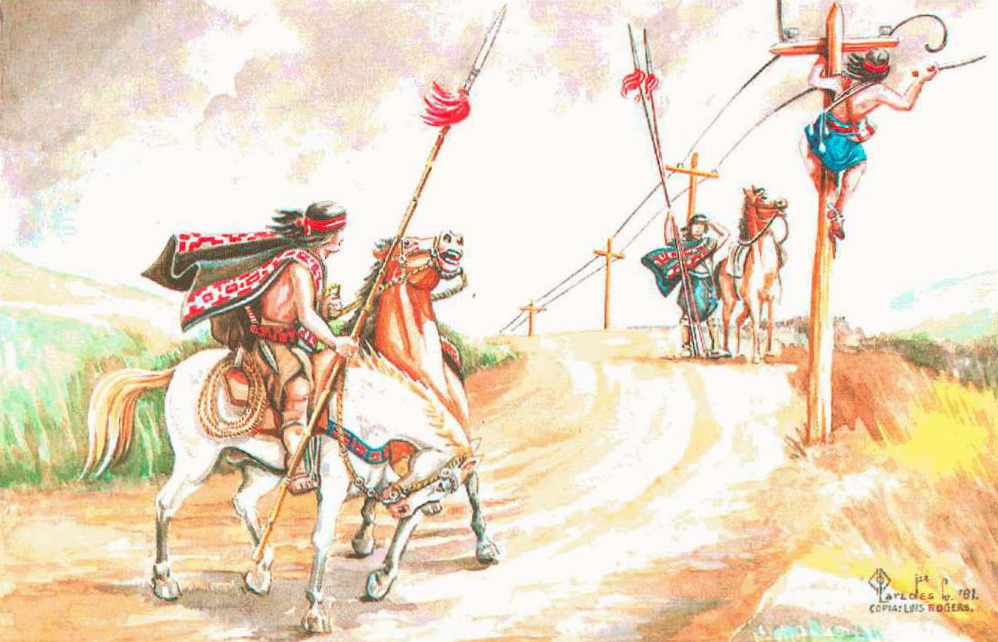
Mapuches destroying telegraph poles, 1871

In 1870 the Chilean Army resumed its operations against the Mapuches. José Manuel Pinto formally declared war to the Mapuches on behalf of Chile in May 1870. In the 1870-1871 period the Mapuches tended to evacuate their families in advance prior to the arrivals of the looting Chilean Army. During the winter of 1870 the Chilean Army continued to burn rukas and steal livestock. These inconclusive operations were subject of ridicule in some Santiago newspapers. Despite this the situation of many Mapuche worsened; newspaper El Meteoro reported scarcity of food, livestock numbers had declined and harvest or sowing had not been possible for many Mapuches for almost three years. Domingo Melín, who went on behalf of Quilapán, sought unsuccessfully in 1870 a peace agreement with Chile.

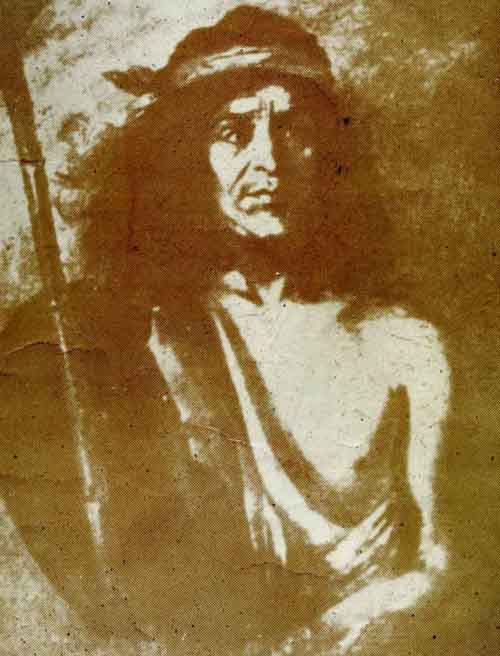
Portrait of Quilapán c. 1870.

In the summer of 1871 Quilapán amassed an army that included reinforcement of Mapuches coming from Argentina and launched a campaign against the fortified Malleco Line and the settlers around it. This attack was repulsed by the Chilean Army whose cavalry had recently replaced their Minié rifles with Spencer carbines, giving them a distinct advantage against the Mapuches.

Quilapán sent a letter in March 1871 to Orozimbo Barbosa seeking for a peace agreement. No agreement took place but hostilities ceased for 10 years (1871–1881). Cornelio Saavedra renounced to the command of the Army of Operations of Araucanía (Ejército de Operaciones en la Araucanía) in 1871 due to political reasons.

=== Informal truce (1871–1881) ===
During the period following the war of 1871 Mapuches in the Chilean occupied parts suffered many abuses and even murder by settlers and Chilean military.

Mapuches noticed the shrinking of Chilean garrisons as Chile sent troops northwards to fight Peru and Bolivia during the War of the Pacific (1879–1883). The apparent weakening of Chilean military presence in Araucanía and the many abuses caused the Mapuches to start planning rebellion.

A case of horse theft in 1880 caused chief Domingo Melín to be escorted by Chilean troops to Angol in order to stand trial. Before reaching Angol Domingo Melín and some of his relatives were killed by the Chilean military. The Mapuches responded to this by attacking the fort and village of Traiguén in September 1880. Almost thousand warriors participated in the retribution, evidence that according to José Bengoa the Mapuches had been preparing for war.

The campaigns of the Argentine Army against the Mapuches in the other side of the Andes pushed in 1880 many Mapuches into Araucanía. Pehuenche chief Purrán was taken prisoner by the Argentine Army and the Argentine Army penetrated in the valley of Lonquimay which Chile considered part of its legal territory. The fast Argentine advance alarmed Chilean authorities and contributed to the Chilean-Mapuche confrontations of 1881.

=== Chilean advance to Cautín (1881) ===
In January 1881 the Mapuches of the Malleco zone rose against the Chilean occupation. The town and forts of Traiguén, Lumaco and Collipulli were attacked.

Having decisively defeated Peru in the battles of Chorrillos and Miraflores in January 1881 Chilean authorities turned their attention to Araucanía seeking to defend the previous advances that had been so difficult to establish. The idea was not only to defend forts and settlements but also to advance the frontier all the way from Malleco River to Cautín River. Interior minister Manuel Recabarren was appointed by president Aníbal Pinto to oversee the process from the town of Angol. Colonel Gregorio Urrutia was summoned from Chilean-occupied Lima to Araucanía to take charge of the Army of the South.

On 28 March Gregorio Urrutia founded the town of Victoria at the shores of Traiguén River. Recabarren personally led a large column that established the forts of Quillem, Lautaro and Pillalelbún. In this last place Recabarren was approached by some Mapuche chiefs who asked him to not advance beyond Cautín River. Recabarren answered by telling them that the whole territory was being occupied. At the founding of Temuco in the northern shores of Cautín River Recabarren met chief Venacio Coñoepán and other chiefs from Choll-Choll who asked him to not advance further.

With the Chilean advance to Cautín River a small mountain range called Cadena de Ñielol remained a focus of Mapuche resistance from where warriors conducted pillaging raids or attacks against vulnerable targets. To end this activity Gregorio Urrutia established a fort in the range.

Initially Mapuches offered little resistance to Chilean advance to Cautín River. Recabarren believed that Mapuches had not reacted because they expected the foundation of new forts and towns to be preceded by parliaments with Chilean authorities.

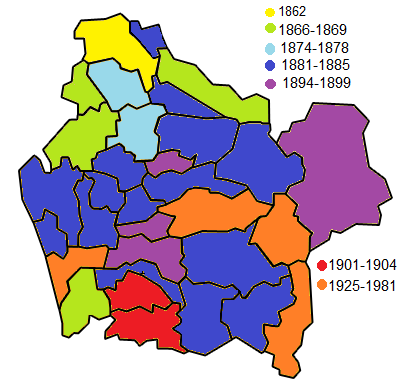
Communes grouped by dates in which they were founded, 19th century communes were founded as forts. And those of Curarrehue and Teodoro Schmidt were organized from previous populations as late as 1981.

=== Mapuche uprising of 1881 ===
Mapuche uprising of 1881
Date	12 November 1881
Location	Araucanía
Result	Chilean victory: Most Mapuche attacks repelled; Nueva Imperial destroyed

Belligerents
Mapuche rebels	Republic of Chile; Mapuche allies

Commanders and leaders
Luis Marileo Colipí; Millapán; Ñanco; Esteban Romero; Ancamilla	Gregorio Urrutia; Venacio Coñoepán

Casualties and losses
700+ dead*; 300+ wounded*; c. 400 dead or wounded^{#}	
- *Between 3 and 9 November; ^{#}10 November at Temuco

A wave of Mapuche attacks began in late February 1881, just a few days after the founding of Temuco in the middle of Mapuche territory. The first major attack was against a caravan of carts carrying injured soldiers from Temuco to Fuerte Ñielol. The whole escort of over 40 soldiers and the 96 injured and sick soldiers were killed. In response to these attacks Gregorio Urrutia launched an attack on the Mapuche warriors of Cadena Ñielol burning in his way over 500 rukas and captured over 800 cattle and horses. On the other side of the Andes Pehuenches assaulted on March the Argentine outpost of Chos Malal killing the whole garrison of 25–30 soldiers. In mid-March Mapuche chiefs met to discuss the situation. They rejected the establishment of new Chilean settlements and decided to go to war. They set 5 November as the date for their uprising.

A group of Arribanos attacked by mistake on wrong date, 3 November, the fort of Quillem. This attack put on alert all Chilean garrisons in Araucanía, settlers took refuge in the forts. On 5 November Mapuches unsuccessfully attacked Lumaco, Puerto Saavedra and Toltén. Around Tirúa Costino warriors suffered heavy casualties in two engagements with a group of more than 400 armed settlers, campesinos and some soldiers. Only Imperial was effectively overrun.

The most important engagements were held at the fort of Ñielol and Temuco located at the heart of Araucanía. In these localities revolting Mapuches were unsuccessful in dislodging Chileans and their allies from fortified positions.

The uprising was not unanimous as a number of Mapuche leaders and communities sided with Chile. After defeat uprising Mapuche chiefs were severely punished. The rukas of Ancamilla and other revolting chiefs were razed.

=== Occupation of peripheral areas (1882–83) ===
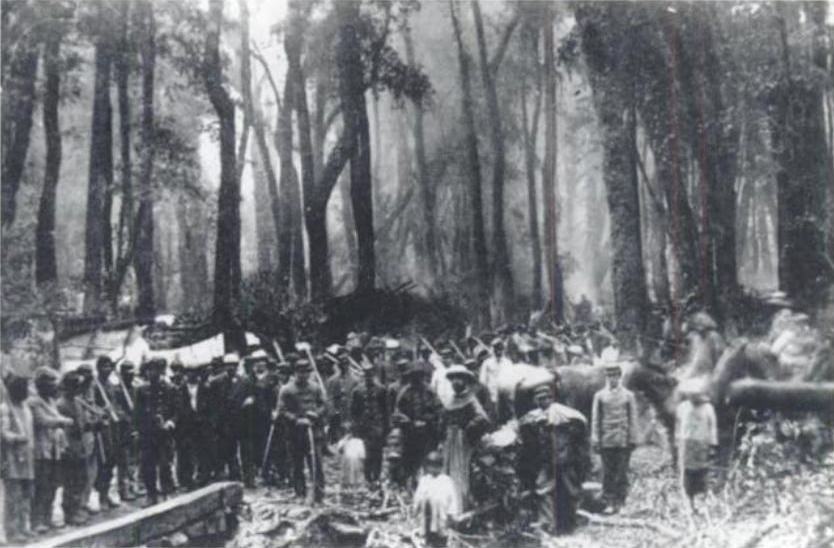
Chilean army during the Occupation of Araucanía

Cornelio Saavedra had considered the ability to cross the Andes one of the Mapuche's principal military strengths. To block Mapuches from freely crossing the Andes and to assert sovereignty over the Andean valleys several expeditions were organized in the summer of 1882. One expedition founded the fort of Nitrito in the Andean valley of Lonquimay, another founded Cunco near Llaima Volcano and yet another expedition founded Curacautín in the upper course of Cautín River.

On 1 January 1883, Chile re-founded the old city of Villarrica ending thus formally the process of occupation of Araucanía. Six months later, on 1 June, president Domingo Santa María declared:

The country has with satisfaction seen the problem of the reduction of the whole Araucanía solved. This event, so important to our social and political life, and so significant for the future of the republic, has ended, happily and with costly and painful sacrifices. Today the whole Araucanía is subjugated, more than to the material forces, to the moral and civilizing force of the republic...

== Aftermath ==
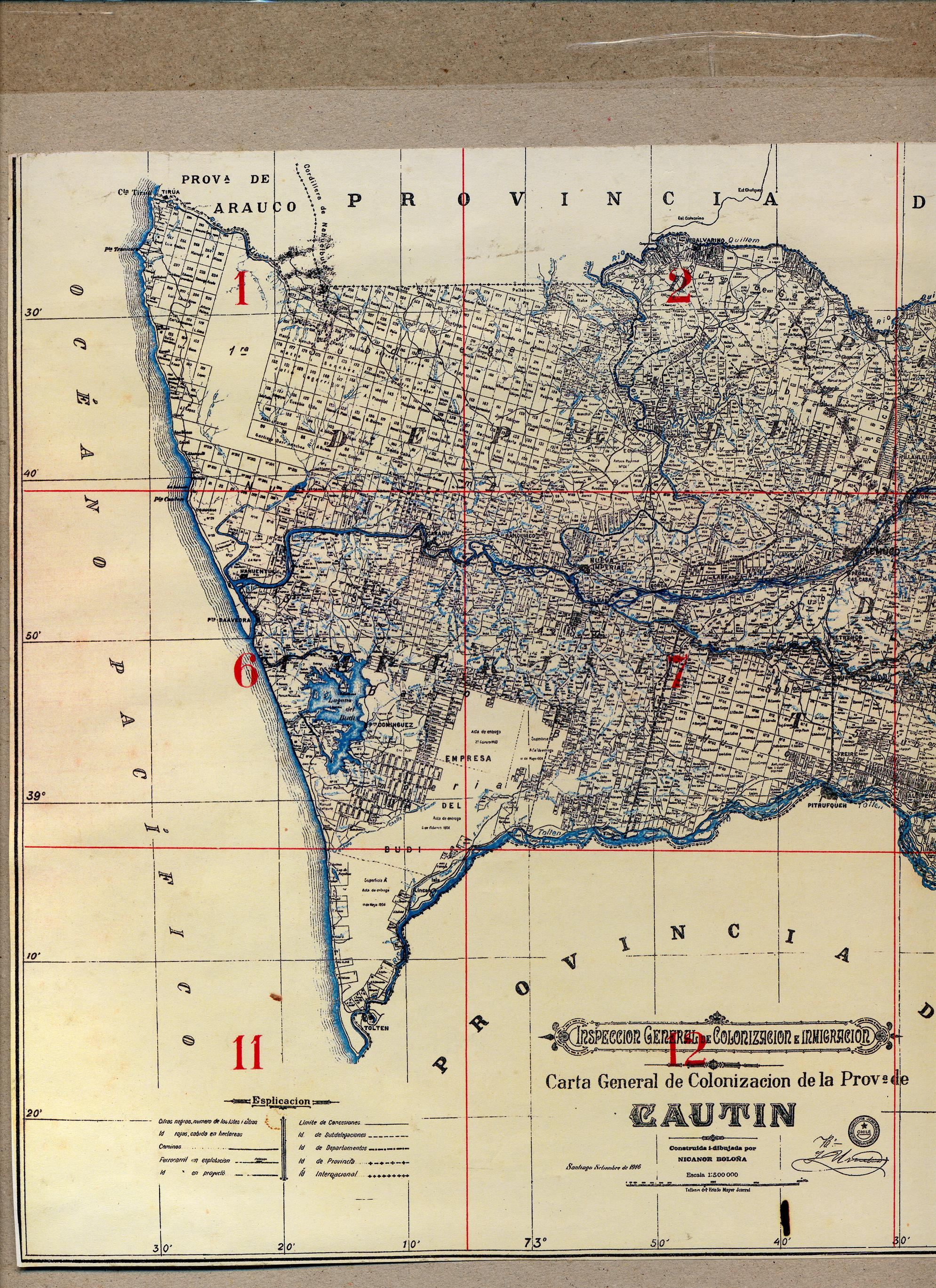
Map of land ownership in western Araucanía in 1916

Historian Ward Churchill has claimed that the Mapuche population dropped from a total of half a million to 25,000 within a generation as result of the occupation and its associated disease and famine. The conquest of Araucanía caused numerous Mapuches to be displaced and forced to roam in search of shelter and food. Some Chilean forts responded by providing food rations. Until around 1900 the Chilean state provided almost 10,000 food rations monthly to displaced Mapuches. Mapuche poverty was recurring theme in Chilean Army memoirs from the 1880s to around 1900.

The Chilean government confined the Mapuche to nearly three thousand reductions (called "títulos de merced"), comprising 500,000 hectares of land.

The forts established in coast became nuclei for the formation of new towns.

In the years following the occupation the economy of Araucanía changed from being based on sheep and cattle herding to one based on agriculture and wood extraction. The loss of land by Mapuches following the occupation caused severe erosion since Mapuches continued to practise a massive livestock herding in limited areas.

=== Chilean and foreign settlers ===
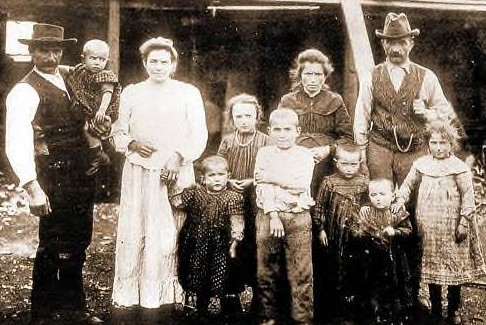
Photo of an Italian immigrant family in Capitán Pastene, Araucanía

When the territory of Araucanía was subdued, the Chilean government issued calls for immigration in Europe.

Some Chilean intellectuals had by 1883 became critical of the German settlers in Southern Chile. Chilean minister Luis Aldunate considered that Germans integrated poorly and that the country should avoid "exclusive and dominant races to monopolize the colonization". For this reason after the Occupation of Araucanía was accomplished, settlers of nationalities other than Germans were preferred in colonization programs.

The most numerous groups of settlers were the Italians who settled mainly around Lumaco, the Swiss who colonized Traiguén and Boers who settled mainly around Freire and Pitrufquén. Other settler nationalities included Englishmen, French people and Germans. There are estimates that by 1886 there were 3,501 foreign settlers in Araucanía, another investigation points out that 5,657 foreign settlers arrived to Araucanía in the 1883–90 period. According to Chile's Agencia General de Colonización in the 1882-1897 period, German settlers made up only 6% of the foreign immigrants that arrived to Chile, ranking behind those of Spanish, French, Italian, Swiss and English origin.

At first Chilean settlers arrived to Araucanía by their own initiative. Later the government begun to stimulate the settlement of Chileans in Araucanía. Chilean settlers were mostly poor and largely remained so in their new lands.

=== Education in Araucanía ===
In 1858 there were 22 public schools in the province of Arauco. This number increased as with each new town established in Araucanía a school was built. Public education definitely overshadowed the older and tiny missionary school system in Araucanía during the conquest. During the conquest many Mapuche chiefs were forced to send their sons to study in Chillán or Concepción. In 1888 the provinces first high school was established in Temuco. Scholar Pablo Miramán claims the introduction of state education had detrimental effects on traditional Mapuche education in Araucanía. The sons of Mapuche chiefs were the key targets of public education.

=== Violence and lawlessness ===
After the Mapuche resistance had been crushed Araucanía suffered a sudden rise in violence and continued to be an insecure zone for many years. Assaults and robbery were common. Because of this until the 1920s carbines, revolvers and other firearms were common in the households of Araucanía.

In 1896 a police force called Cuerpo de Gendarmes de las Colonias was created to improve law and order in the provinces of Arauco, Malleco, Cautín, Valdivia, Llanquihue and Chiloé. This institution was until 1905 led by captain Hernán Trizano. Later Cuerpo de Gendarmes de las Colonias would be fused with other policing bodies to form Carabineros de Chile, Chile's current national police force.

== Military analysis ==
The Mapuche had prior to the 19th century been able to adapt to Spanish warfare. However the 19th century Mapuche proved unable to keep up the Chilean Army's modernization and change in tactics. The Chilean Army benefited greatly from the advances of the Industrial Revolution, as it incorporated machine guns, new types of cannons, rifles and revolvers. Machine guns were incorporated to the Chilean Army in the 1870s and by 1879 Chile had fourteen. Prior to the War of the Pacific the Chilean Army had equipped itself with the most modern weaponry available in Europe and standardised ammunitions. Chile also improved its logistics with the use of steamships in the rivers of Araucanía from the 1860s onward. The expansion of railroads in the 1870s also helped Chilean logistics and communications making it possible for authorities in Santiago to quickly send reinforcements to Araucanía.

Mapuche's had historically few firearms but were able to deal with gunpowder armed enemies whose rate of fire was low. The usual tactic was to await volley fire and then rush before enemies were able to recharge. Analysis of Quilapán's tactics in the 1860s and 1870s reveal they were similar to the ones employed by Lautaro in the 1550s. An example of the technological changes favouring the Chilean Army was when Quilapán's warriors confronted the Chilean cavalry on 25 January 1871. In this confrontation mounted Mapuche warriors armed with spears and bolas faced Chilean troopers who had recently been re-equipped with repeating Spencer carbines, replacing their single shot Minié rifle. After the first Chilean volley the Mapuches charged into hand-to-hand combat, expecting that their opponents' firearms would now be empty. When they received an almost immediate second volley they panicked and fled, and casualties amongst them were high. Despite the success of some Mapuches to arm themselves with these new firearms they were rarely able to make effective use of them, due to a shortage of ammunition.

Another factor was the lack of a cooperative defense against Chilean advances among the Mapuche tribes. Many Mapuche only reacted once Chilean advance reached their territory, for example the Abajinos. In contrast, 17th-century Mapuches who successfully repelled repeated Spanish invasions had a "supra-local level of military solidarity" despite lacking state organization.

== See also ==
- Araucanization
- Arauco War
- Chilenization of Tacna, Arica and Tarapacá
- Conquest of the Desert
- Kingdom of Araucanía and Patagonia

== Bibliography ==
- Bengoa, José (2000). Historia del pueblo mapuche: Siglos XIX y XX (Seventh ed.). LOM Ediciones. ISBN 956-282-232-X.
- Cayuqueo, Pedro (2020). Historia secreta mapuche 2. Santiago de Chile: Catalonia. ISBN 978-956-324-783-1.
- Dillehay, Tom (2007). Monuments, empires, and resistance: The Araucanian polity and ritual narratives. Cambridge University Press. ISBN 978-110-7407-74-9.
- Ferrando Kaun, Ricardo (1986). Y así nació La Frontera... (Second ed.). Editorial Antártica. ISBN 978-956-7019-83-0.
- Pinto Rodríguez, Jorge (2003). La formación del Estado y la nacion, y el pueblo mapuche (Second ed.). Ediciones de la Dirección de Bibliotecas, Archivos y Museos. ISBN 956-244-156-3.
- Villalobos R., Sergio; Silva G., Osvaldo; Silva V., Fernando; Estelle M., Patricio (1974). Historia de Chile (1995 ed.). Editorial Universitaria. ISBN 956-11-1163-2.
