= Mapuche uprising of 1881 =

Ethnic uprising in Chile

Date	3 November 1881 – 12 November 1881
Location	Araucanía
Result	Chilean victory: Most Mapuche attacks repelled; Nueva Imperial destroyed

Belligerents
Mapuche rebels	(Chile) Republic of Chile; Mapuche allies

Commanders and leaders
Luis Marileo Colipí; Millapán; Ñanco; Esteban Romero; Ancamilla	Gregorio Urrutia; Venacio Coñoepán

Casualties and losses
700+ dead* 300+ wounded* c. 400 dead or wounded^{#}	
- *Between 3 November and 9^{#}10 November at Temuco

The last major rebellion of the indigenous Mapuches of Araucanía took place in 1881, during the last phase of the Occupation of Araucanía (1861–1883) by the Chilean state. It was planned by Mapuche chiefs in March 1881 to be launched in November the same year. Mapuche support for the uprising was not unanimous. Some Mapuche factions sided with the Chileans and others declared themselves neutral. The organizers of the uprising did however succeed in involving Mapuche factions that had not previously been at war with Chile. With most of the attacks repelled within a matters of days, Chile went on the next years to consolidate its conquests.

== Background ==
In the 19th century, Chile experienced a fast territorial expansion. Chile established a colony at the Strait of Magellan in 1843, settled Valdivia, Osorno, and Llanquihue with German immigrants and conquered land from Peru and Bolivia. Later Chile would also annex Easter Island. In this context, Araucanía began to be conquered by Chile due to two reasons. First, the Chilean state aimed for territorial continuity and second it remained the sole place for Chilean agriculture to expand.

Between 1861 and 1871 Chile incorporated several Mapuche territories in Araucanía. In January 1881, having decisively defeated Peru in the battles of Chorrillos and Miraflores, Chile resumed the conquest of Araucanía.

The campaigns of the Argentine Army against Mapuches in the other side of the Andes pushed in 1880 many Mapuches into Araucanía. Pehuenche chief Purrán was taken prisoner by the Argentine Army and the Argentine Army penetrated into the valley of Lonquimay which Chile considered part of its legal territory. The fast Argentine advance alarmed Chilean authorities and contributed to the Chilean-Mapuche confrontations of 1881.

=== Abuses against Mapuches ===
During the period following the war of 1871 Mapuches in the Chilean occupied parts suffered many abuses and even murder by settlers and Chilean military. One of the most notable cases was the murder of Domingo Melín in 1880 by elements of the Chilean military.

...[Chileans] raped and killed my women and murdered my sons and impaled my women. How is that you Colonel do not want me to take arms when I have been treated this way?

— A Mapuche chief to Gregorio Urrutia after the uprising

== Pre-uprising events ==
In January 1881, the Mapuches of the Malleco zone rose against the Chilean occupation. The town and forts of Traiguén, Lumaco, and Collipulli were attacked. In response, the Chilean state launched a massive campaign not only to defend forts and settlements but also to push the frontier all the way from the Malleco River to the Cautín River. Interior minister Manuel Recabarren was appointed by president Aníbal Pinto to oversee the process from the town of Angol. Colonel Gregorio Urrutia was summoned from Chilean-occupied Lima to Araucanía to take charge of the Army of the South.

Recabarren personally led a large column that established the forts of Quillem, Lautaro, and Pillalelbún. In the latter, Recabarren was approached by local Mapuche chiefs who asked him not to advance beyond the Cautín River. Recabarren answered by telling them that the whole territory was being occupied. At the founding of Temuco on the northern shores of the Cautín River Recabarren met chief Venacio Coñoepán and other chiefs from Choll-Choll who also asked him not to advance further. On 28 March, Gregorio Urrutia founded the town of Victoria at the bank of the Traiguén River.

With the Chilean advance to the Cautín River, a small mountain range called Cadena de Ñielol remained a focus of Mapuche resistance from which warriors launched pillaging raids or attacks against vulnerable targets. To end this activity Gregorio Urrutia established a fort on the range.

Initially, Mapuches offered little resistance to Chilean advance to the Cautín River. Recabarren believed that Mapuches had not reacted because they expected the foundation of new forts and towns to be preceded by parliaments with Chilean authorities. A wave of Mapuche attacks began in late February 1881, just a few days after the founding of Temuco in the middle of Mapuche territory. The first major attack was against a caravan of carts carrying injured soldiers from Temuco to Fuerte Ñielol. The whole escort of over 40 soldiers and the 96 injured and sick soldiers were killed. In response to these attacks Gregorio Urrutia launched an attack on the Mapuche warriors of Cadena Ñielol burning in his way over 500 rukas and captured over 800 cattle and horses. On the other side of the Andes, Pehuenches assaulted the Argentine outpost of Chos Malal killing the whole garrison of 25–30 soldiers.

== Planning of the uprising ==
In mid-March Venacio Coñoepán and other Mapuche chiefs met. In the meeting the establishment of new settlements was rejected and the chiefs decided to go to war. They set 5 November as the date for their uprising. Coñoepán opposed the uprising and according to Gregorio Urrutia he was unaware of date of the uprising.

== Course of the uprising ==
During the uprising several Chilean forts and towns were attacked.

=== Quillem and Lumaco ===
A group of Arribanos attacked the fort of Quillem on the wrong date, 3 November by mistake. This attack alerted all Chilean garrisons in Araucanía, and settlers took refuge in the forts. On 5 November, 400 Mapuche warriors, allegedly led by Luis Marileo Colipí, attacked the fort of Lumaco. After Chilean reinforcements arrived, Lumaco Mapuches retreated, and waited to hear news of the uprising elsewhere.

=== Nueva Imperial ===
In Nueva Imperial, suspicious Mapuche movements were noticed on 6 November and telegraphs were sent seeking help from Valdivia and Lebu. The town of Nueva Imperial was attacked on 7 November. Defenders fled to the hills and the settlement was effectively destroyed.

=== The coast ===
In the coastal region, the mission of Puerto Saavedra was attacked. The town of Toltén was defended by the Mapuches of Budi Lake who sided with Chile. From Toltén Chile sent 50 militiamen to fight Mapuche rebels. In Toltén as well as in San José de la Mariquina most women were sent to the city of Valdivia as men prepared for hostilities. Chileans and German settlers dug defensive trenches around San José de la Mariquina. At the moment of the uprising it was even thought that rebels could reach Valdivia in the south if they succeeded in penetrating San José de la Mariquina.

Despite having remained outside conflicts in the 19th century, the Costinos of the northern coast joined the 1881 uprising. Costino warriors, after having contributed to the destruction of Imperial and the engagements at Toltén, advanced north to Arauco. Around Tirúa Costino warriors suffered heavy casualties in two engagements with a group of more than 400 armed settlers and campesinos plus some soldiers.

=== Ñielol and Temuco ===
The most important engagements were held at the fort of Ñielol and Temuco located in the heart of Araucanía. Venacio Coñoepán and 60 of his warriors were granted refuge in the fort of Ñielol as he had opposed the uprising. From there Coñoepán contributed to the defence. The uprising Mapuche succeeded in isolating the fort but were unsuccessful in their attack on 9 November. On 10 November, a reinforcement of Mapuches coming from Traigén was defeated by Chilean troops and the siege of Ñielol was lifted. After the Mapuche failure at Ñielol, Chilean troops and Coñoepáns warriors were sent to Temuco that was still under siege. Uprising Mapuches numbered 1,400 to 4,000 depending on source. In command of the Chilean forces inside the fort of Temuco was José M. Garzo. The main engagement at Temuco occurred on 10 November when part of the Chilean troops left the fort of Temuco to chase warriors from Truf Truf and Tromell. The remaining Mapuches unsuccessfully attacked the fort, believing it was almost empty. The defenders used the only cannon in the fort to shoot explosive shells against the attacking Mapuche. About 400 Mapuches were either killed or wounded on 10 November around Temuco.

== Aftermath ==
Uprising Mapuche chiefs were severely punished. When Gregorio Urrutia arrived at Cholchol on 10 November he ordered the construction of a fort in the place of the ruka of chief Ancamilla who had joined the uprising. By doing this, Urrutia fulfilled an old vow:

If I, your friend, knows that you Ancamilla are involved in provocations and assaults, I swear I will build a fort above your ruka. If you remain peaceful nobody will touch you

— Gregorio Urrutia

Ancamilla was taken prisoner and sent handcuffed to a dungeon in Poblete. The fort of Cholchol begun to be built on 22 November and with time, the modern town of Cholchol. The rukas of other revolting chiefs were also razed.

Luis Marileo Colipí who had allegedly attacked Lumaco was stripped of the more than 6,000 ha land he owned near Purén and his brother was taken prisoner and killed. Luis Marileo Colipí managed to escape to Argentina. Little is known of his whereabouts there.

== Bibliography ==
- Bengoa, José (2000). Historia del pueblo mapuche: Siglos XIX y XX (7th ed.). LOM Ediciones. ISBN 956-282-232-X.
- Ferrando Kaun, Ricardo (1986). Y así nació La Frontera... (2nd ed.). Editorial Antártica. ISBN 978-956-7019-83-0.
- Pinto Rodríguez, Jorge (2003). La formación del Estado y la nacion, y el pueblo mapuche (2nd ed.). Ediciones de la Dirección de Bibliotecas, Archivos y Museos. ISBN 956-244-156-3.
