= Juan Lorenzo Colipí =

Mapuche tribal chief

- Died: February 2, 1850
- Citizenship: Mapuche
- Title: Lonko
- Successor: Pedro Colipí

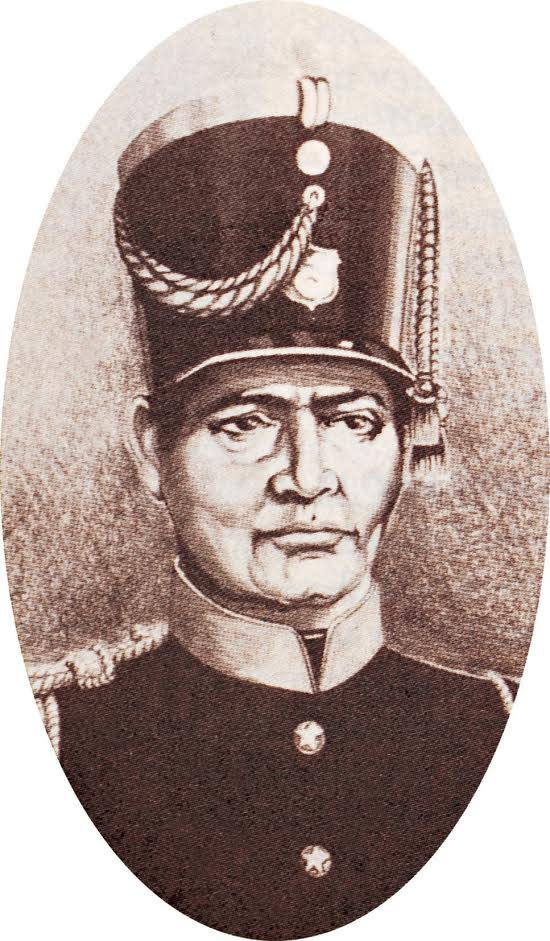
Capitán Juan Lorenzo Colipí

Juan Lorenzo Colipí (Mapudungun: Kolüpi) was a Mapuche lonco active in the politics and warfare in Araucanía in the first half of the 19th century. He participated in the Guerra a muerte (1819–1821) phase of the Chilean Independence War. The influence of Colipí stemmed from his role as an intermediary between various Mapuche tribes and Chilean authorities. In 1834–35 he launched a large malón against Juan Mañil, that temporarily weakened Mañil's faction. Colipí's use of Chilean soldiers in his raids against rival Mapuches created much resentment. His role as broker between Mapuche and Chilean authorities declined as Franciscans and Capuchin missionaries began to assume that role in the 1840s. At the time of his death, he was said to have lost much of the influence he once held among Mapuches.

His death in 1850 was said to have been by poisoning ordered by rival chief Juan Mañil. He was succeeded as lonco by his son Pedro Colipí, who was killed by the men of Mañil in 1852.

== See also ==
- Luis Marileo Colipí
