= Gregorio Urrutia =

Chilean brigadier general (1830–1897)

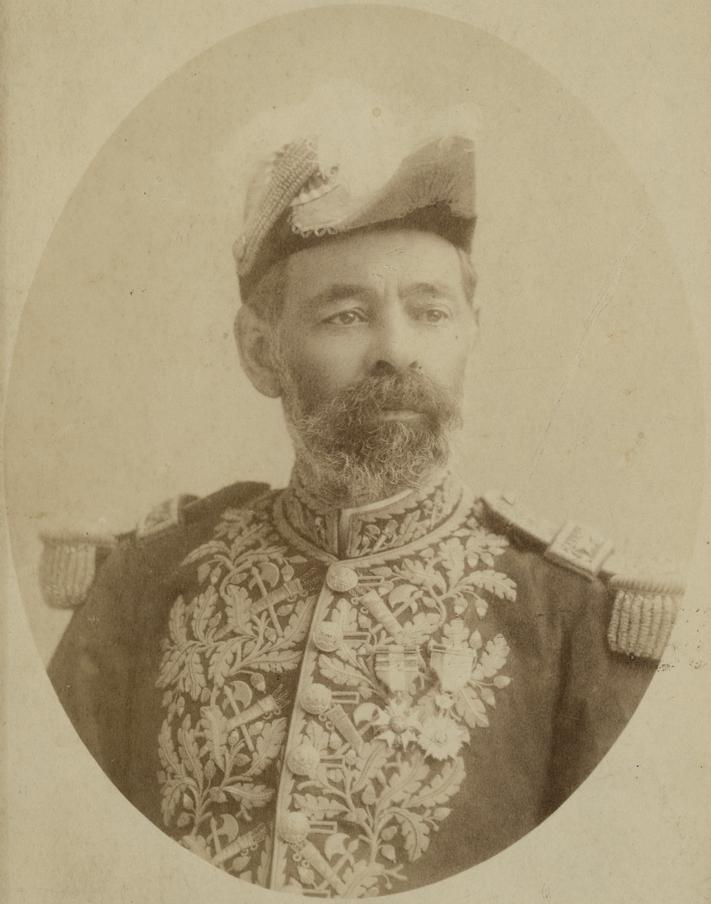
- Born: 1830; San Carlos, Chile
- Died: 1897 (aged 66–67); Santiago, Chile
- Military career
- Allegiance: Chile
- Branch: Army
- Conflicts: Occupation of Lima; Occupation of Araucanía

Gregorio Urrutia Venegas (San Carlos, Chile, 1830 - Santiago, ibidem, September 10, 1897) was a Chilean military official who made a career in the Chilean Army, reaching the rank of brigadier general. He held several military positions and participated in four military conflicts. He was also a deputy and businessman of a company that built railway lines.

He is known for his actions in the Occupation of Araucanía, between 1862 and 1883, actively participating during the sustained process to incorporate that historical region to Chile as well as its inhabitants, the Mapuche. He was also the commander who directed the last operations in the area, consolidating the Chilean dominion in that territory. He founded several settlements and also re-founded some others that are now part of the Araucanía Region.

== Urrutia Family ==
The Urrutia family descended from three brothers from Biscay who arrived in Peru in 1771, and who were relatives of the Spanish general José de Urrutia, who was a field marshal and captain general of Catalonia. These three brothers were named José, Juan and Tomas; Juan and Tomas emigrated to Chile, both settling in Parral. They were the parents of numerous progeny.

His father was Venancio Urrutia Manrique de Lara and his mother was Jesús Venegas Bahamonde, who had nine children.

== Early life ==
=== Beginning of his military career ===
He initially entered the University of Chile, but left to enroll in the Military School. He joined the army on October 22, 1853, beginning his career as ensign standard bearer of the Lanceros Squadron. In his youth he stood out for being a cultured man and a lover of classical literature. He knew several languages, among them Latin and Greek. He was also interested in the scientific advances of the time, which would later be useful in his work in Araucania.

By January 6, 1856 he was already a second lieutenant of the General Staff of the Plaza and was appointed assistant to the General Command of Arms in Santiago. On May 27, 1858 he was promoted to lieutenant and went on to serve in the 2nd Line Battalion.

=== 1859 Revolution ===
With the outbreak of the revolution of 1859, his first military conflict, he joined with his battalion already mentioned to the forces of Manuel Montt's government to confront the liberal rebels.

He was in the campaign over the north and south of the country. On May 12 of the same year, he fought in the battle of Copiapó, under the orders of Lieutenant Colonel José Antonio Villagrán, and on April 29 he participated in the decisive battle of Cerro Grande, under the orders of General Juan Vidaurre-Leal. He was specially recommended for his performance in this last battle and promoted to captain. On September 18 he was among the loyal forces sent to quell the revolutionary mutiny in Valparaíso, being the last military action of the war, with which hostilities ceased within the country.

== Occupation of Araucanía ==
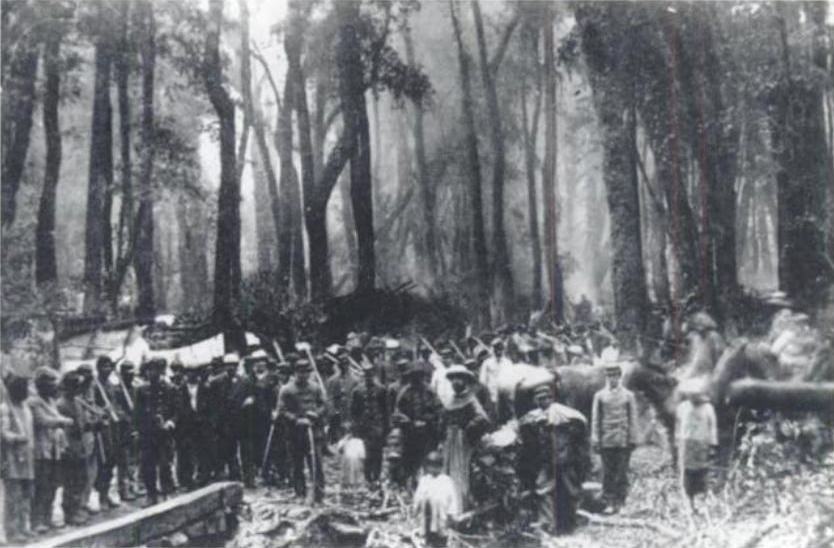
Troops of the Chilean Army during the occupation of Araucania.

In 1862 he joined the Assembly Corps and was assigned to the army that began the occupation of the Araucanía, making several entries into the interior of that region and participating in several armed actions. First from January 1862 to December 1865, then from December 1866 to November 1871 and from April 1878 to November 1879.

On January 12, 1862, he participated in the attack on the fertile plains of the Cautín River, under the command of Sergeant Major Emeterio Letelier. On February 23, 1863, he was appointed instructor of the civic squadrons No. 1 and No. 3 of the Department of Arauco and of the civic infantry company of Lebu. On January 15, 1864, he was appointed commander in commission of the civic infantry brigade of Arauco. On December 28, he was appointed major in commission of the civic battalion of Lota and Coronel.

Between December 24, 1865 and December 6, 1866, he remained in the coastal fort of Lota due to the threat of the Spanish squadron, during the war against Spain. This war momentarily paralyzed the operations of the Chilean army in the Araucanía. On July 10, 1866, he was appointed commander in commission of the Lota civic infantry brigade and in the same year he was promoted to sergeant major.

In 1869 he was promoted to lieutenant colonel and on July 23 of that year he was appointed, for a period of three years, governor of the Department of Lebu. On December 17, 1870, he was appointed adjutant general of the Army General Staff on "The Border". During these years, under the orders of the commander of the Lower Frontier Cornelio Saavedra, he participated directly in the formation of the towns of Lebu, Cañete, Purén, Lumaco and Toltén, and the forts of Contulmo, Pangueco, Quidico and Quele.

In 1872 he requested temporary retirement from the army and in 1877 he rejoined it, being appointed governor and military commander of Lumaco on September 6 of that year. As Saavedra's lieutenant and trusted man, he was entrusted with advancing the Malleco line to establish the Traiguén line, which he carried out from 1877 to 1879. He also assumed command of the Regimiento Zapadores, a military corps that had recently been created and with which he would carry out work during the advance, such as opening roads, constructing buildings, laying telegraph lines, among others. He founded the Traiguén plaza, which soon became the most important town in the area after Angol. He also established the Mirador, Lebuluán and Adehuencul forts in strategic positions to contain any attempted attack by the arribanos groups. During the advance, he tried to deal well with the Mapuche people, obtaining the sympathy of the neighboring groups of the towns he had established, avoided offending them and punished some excesses committed by officers or soldiers. He successfully completed his work and without having used arms, incorporating an extension of more than 100,000 km^{2} to the Chilean territory by peaceful means, spending in the enterprise a little more than $12,000 Chilean pesos of the time. During the operations of 1879 he was appointed on January 8 to replace the general in chief of the Army of the South and on April 21 he was named commander in chief of that army. In the same year, he was also promoted to colonel.

During the occupation, he led violent attacks on various indigenous communities and considered the indigenous people of the region to be 'uncivilized'.

== War of the Pacific ==
With Chile's declaration of war on Peru and Bolivia on April 5, 1879, he stopped his work on the Traiguén line and moved north to join the army of operations in the area, which was commanded successively by Generals Erasmo Escala and Manuel Baquedano.

On December 28 he was appointed delegate of the General Intendancy of the Army and Navy in campaign. He accompanied the Minister of War Rafael Sotomayor in his work as military advisor until a few days before his death in May 1880.5 During the campaign of Tacna and Arica, he attended in a highly satisfactory way the logistic rearguard services in the battle of Alto de la Alianza and the battle of Arica, on May 26 and June 7 respectively, in spite of having scarce transport elements and reduced personnel of employees. The day before the second battle mentioned above, he was on board the Chilean squadron in the bombardment of Arica.

On November 8, during the Lima campaign, he was appointed chief of staff of the I Division of the army of operations, under the command of Patricio Lynch. He was present at the battle of Chorrillos and the battle of Miraflores, fought on January 13 and 15, 1881. After the last mentioned battle, he left with Lynch's division to Callao, in order to ensure order in the city. During the occupation of Lima, he carried out his last functions in the war, collaborating with the organization of public services, the installation of customs and the operation of warehouses and dependencies in general.

For his performance in the war he received several awards. On September 1, 1880 he was awarded a gold medal for the first campaign of the war and a gold bar for having been in a war action, and on January 14, 1882 he was awarded a gold medal for the campaign of Lima and two bars of the same metal for his performance in the battles of Chorrillos and Miraflores.

== Return to Araucanía ==
At the beginning of 1881, a new Mapuche uprising against the Chilean occupation began to develop in the Araucanía, so President Aníbal Pinto again requested his services in the area due to his previous experience. On March 16 he was appointed Chief of Staff of the Southern Army, and on May 16, during operations in the Araucanía, he took over as interim commander-in-chief of the same army. He was also appointed, for a period of three years, intendant of the department of Angol.

Upon arriving in Traiguén, he was informed of the situation in the area and began to take various measures, such as supplying the barracks and establishing guidelines for dealing with the Mapuches. In Collipulli he organized a division and on the south bank of the Traiguén River he built Fort Victoria. With this fort he closed the only door of communication that remained between the arribanas and the abajinas tribes. He also established the forts Curacautín, Nupangue and Ñielol. He then proceeded to fight the Mapuche rebels, a battle that lasted twelve days and in which almost all the rebel chiefs who had taken refuge in the Ñielol chain of hills, the center and refuge of the Mapuche resistance, died.

In November of that same year, he once again faced a new Mapuche uprising, which he also managed to crush. On July 16 of the following year, he was appointed full commander of the Southern Army. In that year he founded the Plaza de Nueva Imperial and the forts of Carahue, Galvarino, Cholchol and Freire.

In 1883 he founded the plaza of Pucón and the forts Villarrica, Meuquen, Palguin and Cunco. With the expedition on Villarrica he would complete the occupation of Araucanía.

== Post-military ==
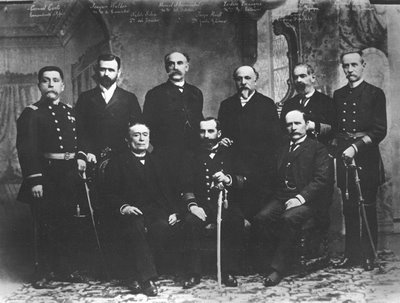
Photograph of the members of the Iquique Junta of 1891. Urrutia is on the right side of those standing, second to last.

Once the occupation of Araucanía was over, he was appointed on October 26 as commander in chief of the Tacna and Arica division, and on June 5 of the following year he was named inspector general of the Southern Army. On February 28, 1885, he was appointed subinspector of the army and on June 5, he was named acting inspector general of the army. As a member of the Liberal Party, he was elected that year, for a period of four years, deputy for the Department of Itata.

In 1887 he was promoted to brigadier general, and on August 23 of that year he was appointed inspector general of the Chilean National Guard. As a member of the Liberal Party, he was elected that year, for a period of four years, deputy for the Collipulli Department. He also joined the War and Navy Commission. During those years he had founded, in the company of another comrade in arms, a company dedicated to the construction of railway lines, which was maintained for several years despite the ups and downs of the country and cooperated in the development of Araucanía.

In 1891 he joined the congressional alliance that sought to overthrow President José Manuel Balmaceda, forming part of the Government Board of Iquique that was led by Jorge Montt. He was appointed advisor to the congressional army and directed the first military actions of the civil war of that year in the northern theater of the country. Permanently retired from the army after the war, he dedicated himself to managing the company he had created. He died in Santiago, on September 10, 1897.
