= Rosario Ortiz =

Chilean journalist (1827-?)

- Born: 10 October 1827; Concepción, Chile
- Died: ?
- Resting place: General Cemetery of Concepción
- Other names: La Monche
- Occupations: Journalist, activist

Rosario Ortiz (born 10 October 1827; year of death unknown), also known by the nickname La Monche, was a Chilean political activist who supported the Revolution of 1859, led by General José María de la Cruz against President Manuel Montt.

She recruited soldiers for this cause and enlisted as a vivandera (sutler) in the Army of the South, fighting in the Battle of Loncomilla.

In the Revolution of 1859 she returned to take up arms against Montt as part of the revolutionary troops of Alemparte. She eventually reached the rank of captain.

La Monche is also recognized as one of the first women journalists in Chile, and the first woman to write for a newspaper in Concepción. She contributed to El Correo del Pueblo and Revista del Sur as a fervent opponent of Montt.

Her remains lie in a modest grave in the General Cemetery of Concepción, with an epitaph which reads: "Here lies La Monche, lived and died for freedom. A worker."
