= Venacio Coñoepán =

Mapuche chief

- Citizenship: Mapuche
- Title: Chief

Venacio Coñoepán or simply Coñoepán was a Mapuche chief active in the Mapuche resistance to the Occupation of Araucanía (1861-1883). At the founding of Temuco in 1881 in the northern shores of Cautín River Venacio Coñoepán and other chiefs from Choll-Choll met with minister Manuel Recabarren and asked him to not advance further. Later in the same year Venacio Coñoepán headed a parliament that united different Mapuche factions against Chile. Nevertheless, he subsequently fought on the side of the Republic of Chile against Mapuche rebels during the Mapuche uprising of 1881.

== Bibliography ==
- Bengoa, José (2000). Historia del pueblo mapuche: Siglos XIX y XX (Seventh ed.). LOM Ediciones. ISBN 956-282-232-X.
