= Domingo Melín =

- Died: 1880
- Citizenship: Mapuche
- Title: Chief

Domingo Melín or simply Melín was a Mapuche chief active in the Mapuche resistance to the Occupation of Araucanía (1861–1883). In 1870 Domingo Melín went on behalf of Quilapán to seek a peace agreement with Chile. He was murdered by elements of the Chilean military in 1880.

== Bibliography ==
- Bengoa, José (2000). Historia del pueblo mapuche: Siglos XIX y XX (Seventh ed.). LOM Ediciones. ISBN 956-282-232-X.
