= Luis Marileo Colipí =

- Citizenship: Mapuche
- Title: Chief

Luis Marileo Colipí was a Mapuche chief active in the Mapuche resistance to the Occupation of Araucanía (1861–1883). Luis Marileo Colipí allegedly attacked Lumaco during the Mapuche uprising of 1881. Because of this he was stripped of the more than 6,000 hectares (15,000 acres) land he owned near Purén. His brother who had also participated in the uprising was taken prisoner and killed. After the uprising Luis Marileo Colipí fled to Argentina.

== Bibliography ==
- Bengoa, José (2000). Historia del pueblo mapuche: Siglos XIX y XX (Seventh ed.). LOM ediciones. ISBN 956-282-232-X.
