= Cornelio Saavedra Rodríguez =

Chilean politician and military figure

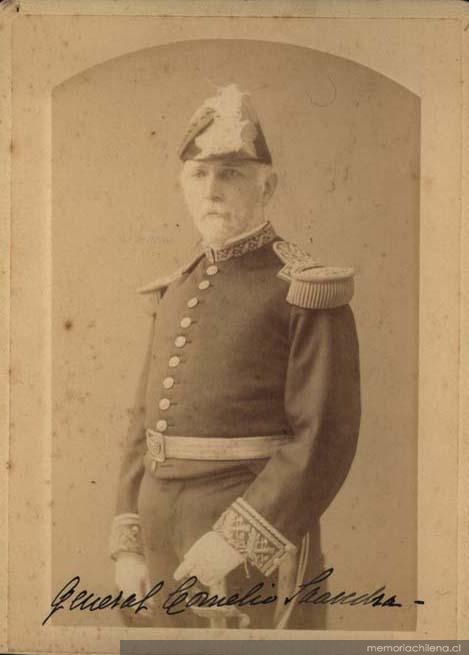
- Born: 1821; Santiago, Chile
- Died: April 7, 1891 (aged 69–70); Santiago, Chile
- Military career
- Allegiance: Chile
- Branch: Army
- Service years: 1838 - 1883
- Rank: Division General
- Commands: Inspector General
- Conflicts: 1851 Chilean Revolution; Occupation of Araucanía; War of the Pacific: Occupation of Lima

Cornelio Saavedra Rodríguez (1821 – April 7, 1891) was a Chilean politician and military figure who played a major role in the Occupation of the Araucanía.

His parents were Manuel Saavedra Cabrera, son of the president of the First Government of Buenos Aires in 1810 and Argentine general, Cornelio Saavedra, and Josefina Rodriguez Salcedo. He married Dorotea Rivera Serrano, daughter of Chilean General Juan de Dios Rivera and Freire de Andrade and Galeazzo Maria del Rosario Alfaro Serrano. At the age of 15 years he entered the military academy, graduating with the rank of second lieutenant of infantry in the Chilean Army in the following year. In 1837 he was assigned to Battalion Chillán, where he rose to lieutenant at the age of 17 years. In 1847 he was promoted to the rank of sergeant major and retired from active duty for health reasons in 1849. Two years later he was called to participate in the 1851 Revolution to overthrow the newly elected President Manuel Montt and to repeal the 1833 Constitution. In 1857 he was appointed mayor and commander of weapons of Arauco, in whose care had to quell the uprising of the southern provinces during the revolution of 1859. That year he was reinstated to the Army with the rank of sergeant major. Cornelio Saavedra Rodríguez took office as General Commander of the Chilean Navy in 1860, but left the charge the same year. In 1862 he was promoted to lieutenant colonel.

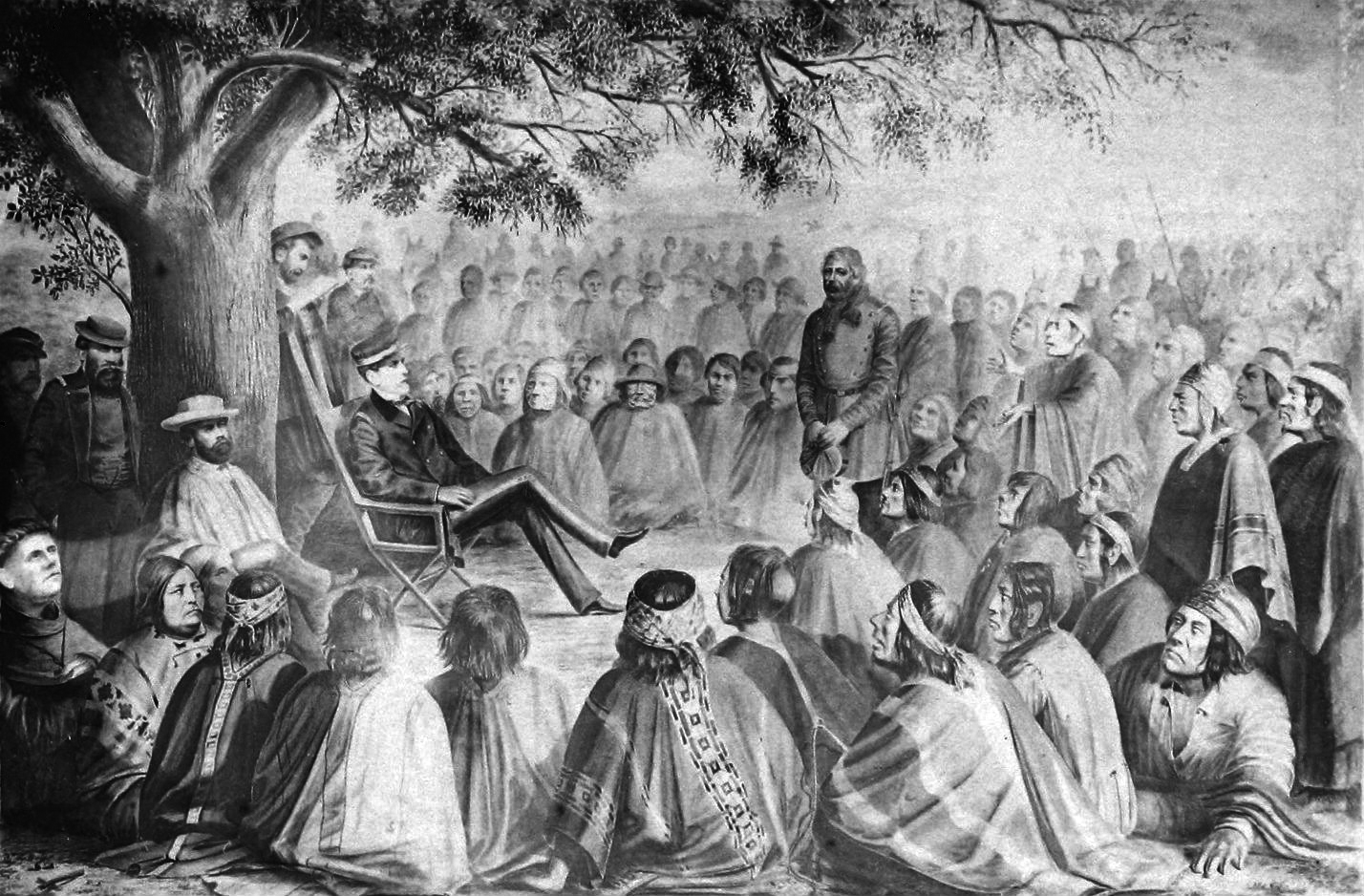
Cornelio Saavedra Rodríguez in meeting with the main loncos of Araucania in 1869

Saavedra presented a draft plan to President Manuel Montt to advance Chilean territory to the south of La Frontera (consisting of the Bio Bio River), a plan that was rejected. After the incident involving the Frenchman Orélie-Antoine de Tounens, self-proclaimed King of the Araucania and Patagonia declaring the territories of his "kingdom" under the protection of France, President José Joaquín Pérez Mascayano decided to occupy the area immediately approving Saavedra's plan for the occupation of the Araucanía during its first phase..

He led campaigns culminating in the submission of the Mapuche. The first phase consisted of building forts and small villages along the river Malleco, going into Mapuche territory (including the foundation of the city of Angol in 1862). The second phase (1867–1869) was decisive in advance, but the third phase in 1870 was not as successful and led to further negotiations.

After the pacification of Araucanía, he participated in the War of the Pacific. He later retired from military life was made a deputy for San Carlos, Chile (1861–1864), Linares, Chile (1864–1867), Carelmapu (1867–1870), Nacimiento, Chile and Angol (1870–1873) and Minister of War (1879).

Political offices
Preceded by Manuel García de la Huerta	Minister of War and Navy; 1878–1879	Succeeded by Basilio Urrutia
Military offices
Preceded by Juan Vidaurre-Leal	Navy General Commander; 1860–1861	Succeeded by Santiago Aldunate
Preceded by Manuel Baquedano	Army Inspector General; 1881–1883	Succeeded by Emilio Sotomayor
