= Battle of Loncomilla =

Part of the 1851 Chilean Revolution

- Part of the 1851 Chilean Revolution
Date	8 December 1851
Location	Loncomilla, Chile
Result	Government victory

Belligerents
(Chile) Conservative government	(Chile) Liberal rebels; Warriors of Mañil

Commanders and leaders
(Chile) Manuel Bulnes: Giuseppe Rondizzoni	(Chile) José María de la Cruz; Mañil

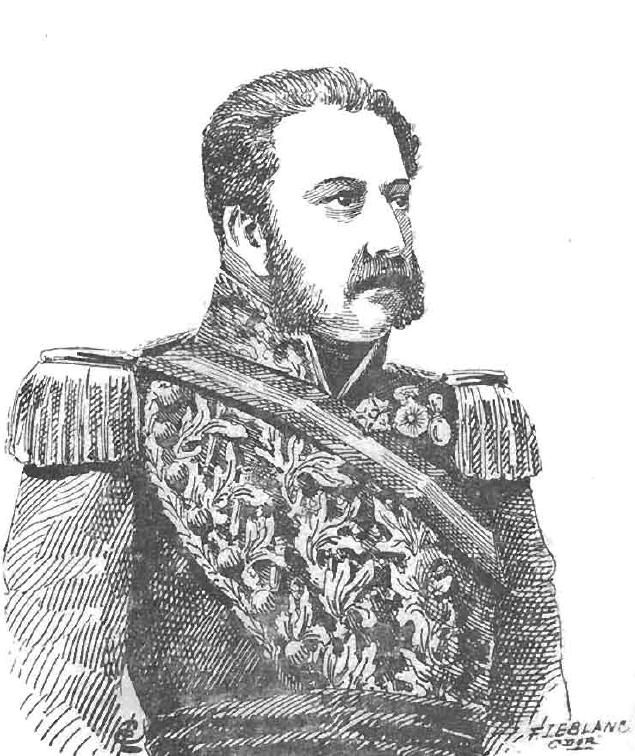
Manuel Bulnes, president of Chile’s conservative government

The Battle of Loncomilla was the decisive battle of the 1851 Chilean Revolution between conservative government and liberal rebel forces on 8 December 1851. The conservative victory in the battle essentially crushed the revolution. The rebel army of José María de la Cruz's was aided by Mapuche chief Mañil who participated in battle with his warriors. After defeat at Loncomilla Mañil returned south. According to historian José Bengoa Mapuches saw the government in Santiago as their main enemy, explaining thus the participation of Mapuches on the side of José María de la Cruz Concepción-based revolt.

== Bibliography ==
- Bengoa, José (2000) [1985]. Historia del pueblo mapuche: Siglo XIX y XX [Mapuche History: Nineteenth and Twentieth Centuries]. Biblioteca del bicentenario (in Spanish) (6th ed.). Santiago de Chile: LOM Ediciones. ISBN 978-956-282-232-9.
