= Mapuche silverwork =

Aspect of indigenous Chilean culture

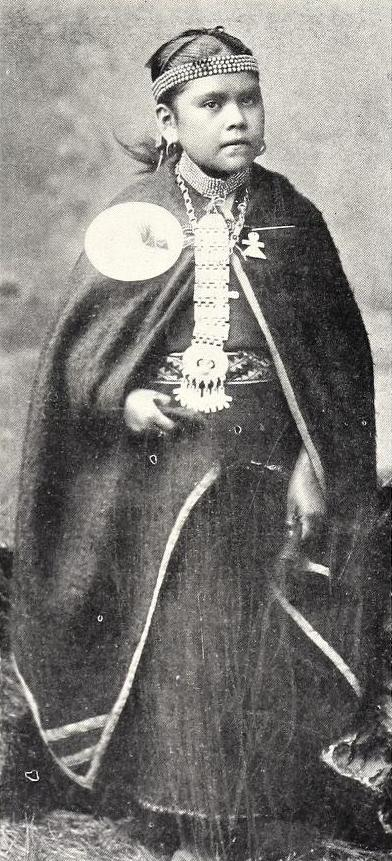
The daughter of a lonko dressed in traditional Mapuche silverwork at around 1900.

Drawing of a trapelacucha, a silver finery piece, 20th century.

Mapuche silverwork is one of the best known aspects of Mapuche material culture. The adornments have been subject to changes in fashion but some designs have resisted change.

== History ==
=== Prior tradition of gold adornments ===
Mapuche people had a gold-related cultural tradition that predates the Inca invasion. In the 16th century, at the time of the Spanish conquest of Chile, Mapuches are reported by various chroniclers to have used gold adornments. According to Zavala and co-workers (2021) the widespread gold-related toponyms in Mapuche lands and early Spanish reports of gold objects, plus the easiness for the Spanish to find gold mines suggests that gold mining did occur in Pre-Hispanic Chile south of Itata River, well beyond the borders of the Inca Empire.

Historian José Toribio Medina posits that most of the Mapuche gold adornments were despoiled by the Spanish during the conquest. Local folklore says much gold was also hidden from the Spanish and gold mines collapsed on purpose. Gold mining became a taboo among Mapuches in colonial times, and gold mining prohibited under death penalty. Prior to the Destruction of the Seven Cities serving the Spanish in gold mining had been a deadly activity that killed many Mapuches. Some 17th-century Spanish sources specifically reject the notion that Mapuche used gold adornments or valued the metal.

=== Development of silverwork ===
During the latter half of the 18th century, Mapuche silversmiths began to produce large amounts of silver finery. The surge of silversmithing activity may be related to the 1641 parliament of Quillín and the 1726 parliament of Negrete that decreased hostilities between Spaniards and Mapuches and allowed trade to increase between colonial Chile and the free Mapuches. In this context of increasing trade, Mapuches began in the late 18th century to accept payments in silver coins for their products; usually cattle or horses. These coins and silver coins obtained in political negotiations served as raw material for Mapuche metalsmiths (Mapudungun: rüxafe). By the 18th century silver had effectively filled the place gold previously had in Mapuche culture. Old Mapuche silver pendants often included unmelted silver coins, a circumstance which has helped modern researchers to date the objects. The bulk of the Spanish silver coins originated from mining in Potosí in Upper Peru. The foreign origin of most silver (liqen, lien, lighen) explains why there is scarcity of silver-related Mapuche placenames relative to those referring to gold (milla).

The great diversity in silver finery designs is indebted to the fact that designs were done to be identified with different reynma (families), lof mapu (lands) as well as specific lonkos and machis. Mapuche silver finery was also subject to changes in fashion albeit designs associated with philosophical and spiritual concepts have not undergone major changes.

In late 18th century and early 19th century, Mapuche silversmithing activity and artistic diversity reached its climax. All important Mapuche chiefs of the 19th century are supposed to have had at least one silversmith. The 1869 war between Chile and independent Mapuches provoked a famine among Mapuches in the winter of 1869, with the situation being worsened by a smallpox epidemic. This situation led some Mapuches to sell their silver adornments in the towns of La Frontera to obtain food.

As of 1984, Mapuche scholar Carlos Aldunate noted that there were no silversmiths alive among contemporary Mapuches.

== Appearance ==
Although these adornments showed some variation in form, the principal one appears to be a set of three separate columns of flattened silver links joined to each other by square alternating links. At the top of the set of columns, and holding them together, is a flat two-headed bird figure and at the base is a flat semicircle or trapezoid that usually has a series of small disks dangling from its base. The wearer would place the object hanging from his/ her neck and down the chest.
