= Traiguén River =

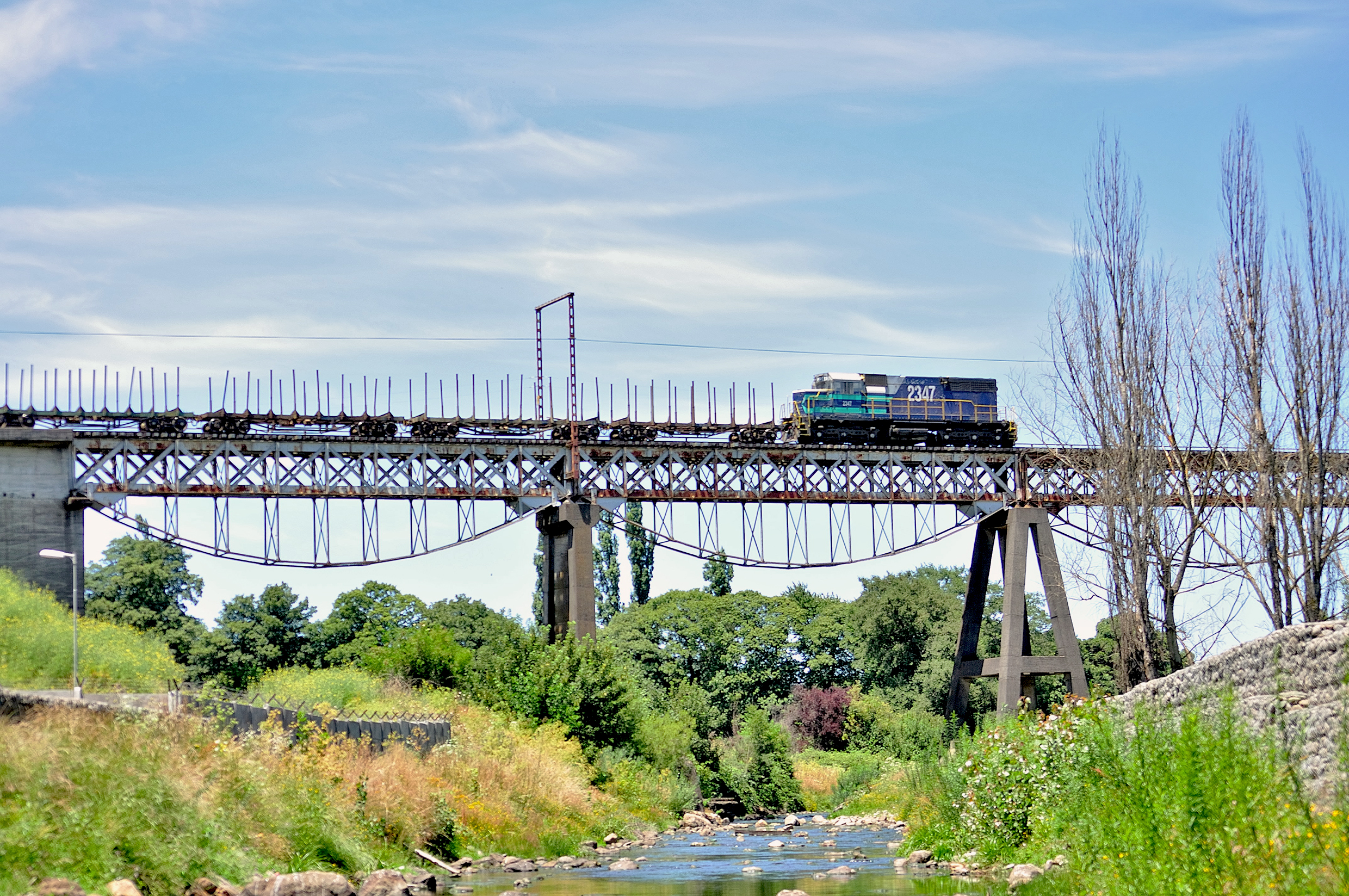

Location
- Country: Chile

The Traiguén River is a river of Chile.

== See also ==
- List of rivers of Chile
