= Quilapán =

Mapuche tribal chief

José Santos Quilapán
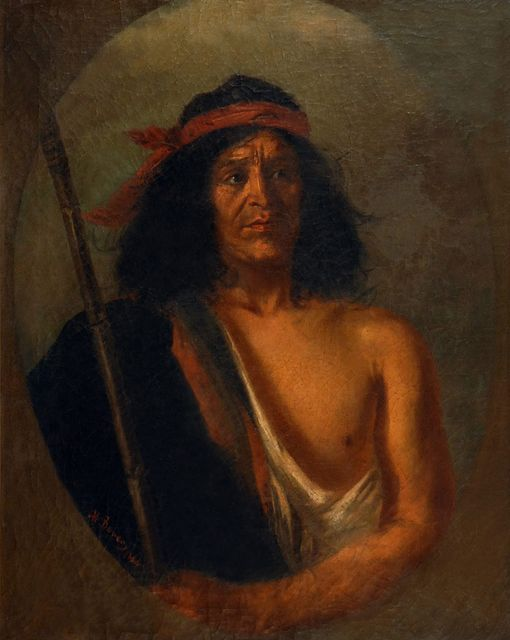
- Portrait of Quoilapán c. 1870

Mapuche leader
- Preceded by: Mañil

Lonko

Personal details
- Died: 1875 or 1876 Loncoche

Military service
- Battles/wars: Occupation of Araucanía: Battle of Quechereguas

José Santos Quilapán or simply Quilapán (Mapudungun: Külapang) was a Mapuche chief active in the Mapuche resistance to the Occupation of Araucanía (1861–1883). He was the main chief of the Arribanos and inherited his charge as chief from his father Mañil.
