= Pedro Cayuqueo =

Mapuche-Chilean journalist and activist

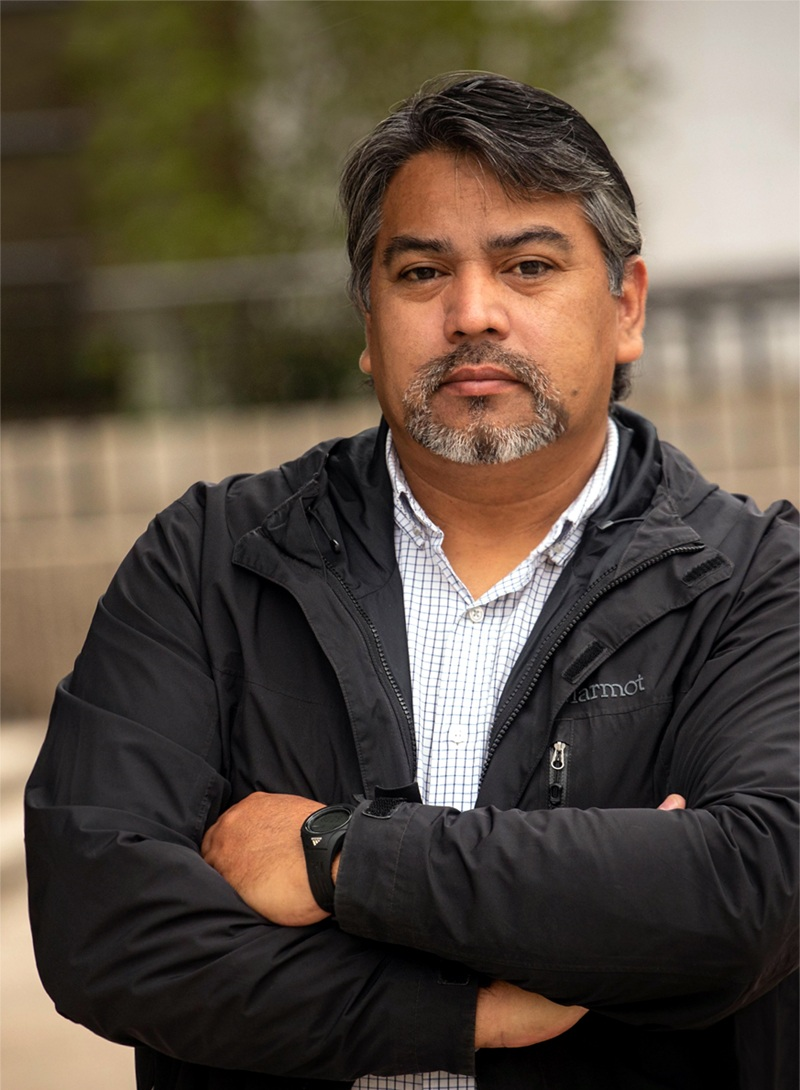
- Cayuqueo in 2021.
- Born: Pedro César Cayuqueo Millaqueo; 28 December 1975 (age 50); Puerto Saavedra, Araucanía Region, Chile
- Education: Universidad de La Frontera
- Occupation: Journalist
- Known for: Mapuche activism
- Notable work: Historia secreta mapuche
- Movement: Coordinadora Arauco-Malleco (1998–2001)
- Criminal charges: Usurpation of land and wood theft
- Criminal penalty: 61 days in prison and a fine
- Children: 1
- Awards: Santiago Municipal Literature Award (2018)
- Website: www.pedrocayuqueo.cl

Pedro César Cayuqueo Millaqueo (born 28 December 1975) is a Chilean journalist and activist of indigenous Mapuche descent involved in the Mapuche conflict.

== Biography ==
Pedro Cayuqueo Millaqueo was raised in the Cacique Luis Millaqueo indigenous community, located in the commune of Nueva Imperial. He has written eight books on opinion journalism, investigative journalism and historical revisionism, all of which revolve around the Mapuche cause and were published by Catalonia. His best-selling book is "Historia Secreta Mapuche" (Secret Mapuche History, 2017). He was the founder and first executive editor of the newspapers Mapuche Times and Azkintuwe, in Temuco, both of which circulated for over a decade and were also published in Argentina. He was the presenter of the TV program Kulmapu – a show centered in the Mapuche culture – which aired on CNN Chile and VTR in 2015 and 2016. He has been a regular columnist at The Clinic and Caras magazine, and has also written for the newspapers El Austral de Temuco and La Tercera.

In the mid 1990s, he entered Law School at Temuco Catholic University with the intention of becoming the first Mapuche lawyer to take their cause to the Courts of Justice. Then, in 1998, he joined the Coordinadora Arauco-Malleco (CAM), and one year later – acting as its spokesman – he delivered an address before the Office of the United Nations High Commissioner for Human Rights in Geneva, Switzerland. As soon as he returned to his country, in May 1999, Special Prosecutor Archivaldo Loyola ordered his imprisonment accusing him and other CAM leaders of usurpation of land, theft of wood and misprision of felony. The legal actions taken against Cayuqueo by the Chilean government forced him to drop out of law school, and – although briefly – he was incarcerated more than once, serving time in the prisons of Lebu, Traiguén, and Nueva Imperial. He left the CAM in 2001.

He then went on to become a journalist, in order to defend the Mapuche cause from a less confrontational position.

From 2012 to 2016, he was a member of the Advisory Board at the Instituto Nacional de Derechos Humanos, and has also been in the board of directors at the think tank Espacio Público, as well as the Corporación de Profesionales Mapuche. In 2021, he published The Wallmapu, a compilation of stories involving anti-Mapuche racism and the cultural movement of the Mapuche. The title is a play on words, combining "Wallmapu" (from Mapudungún, "our land"), the historical name for the Mapuche territory, with the title of Pink Floyd's album The Wall.

His latest literary work is a children's book entitled Iñchiñ ("We"), published in 2022.

Cayuqueo has one daughter. He currently resides in Viña del Mar.

== Works ==
- Solo por ser indios, Catalonia, Santiago, 2012
- La voz de los lonkos, Catalonia, Santiago, 2013
- Esa ruca llamada Chile, Catalonia, Santiago, 2014
- Huenchumilla. La historia del hombre de oro, Catalonia, Santiago, 2015
- Fuerte Temuco, Catalonia, Santiago, 2016
- Historia secreta mapuche, Catalonia, Santiago, 2017
- Porfiada y rebelde es la memoria, Catalonia, Santiago, 2018
- Historia secreta mapuche 2, Catalonia, Santiago, 2020
- The Wallmapu, Catalonia, Santiago, 2021
- Iñchiñ, Catalonia, Santiago, 2022

== Awards ==
- Premio del Colegio de Periodistas de Chile, 2011
- Premio al Periodismo Iberoamericano Samuel Chavkin, 2013 (North American Congress on Latin America and New York University
- Santiago Municipal Literature Award, best non-fiction work for Historia secreta mapuche, 2018
