= Ruka (house type) =

Traditional Mapuche house type

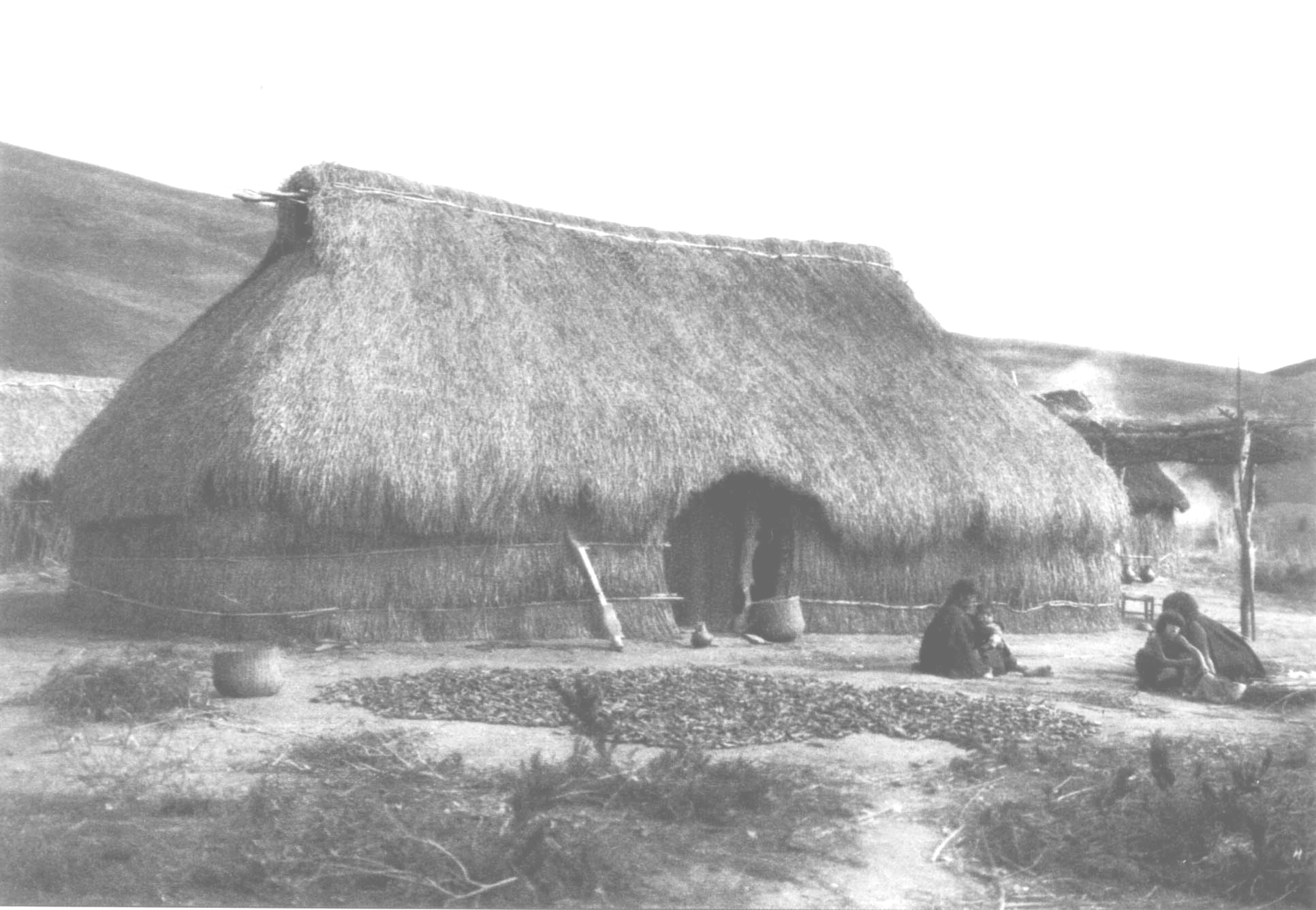
A Mapuche ruka in 1930.

A ruka or ruca is a traditional Mapuche house type. Rukas were originally round with a conical roof. Rukas are typically built communally. Rukas traditionally lack windows and are made up of a single open space in the interior. The interior of the rukas are organized around a central fireplace.

Travellers in the first half of the 20th century compared the housing conditions of rukas favourably to the tenements of Santiago and the countryside cottages of non-Mapuche Chilean farmers.

== Overview ==
The ruca is the most important building in Mapuche architecture, where they live traditionally. Ruca, in Mapudugun, means "house".

Its area varies between 120 and 240 square meters. This construction materials are dependent on the surrounding land. For example: They are formed of planks or poles of coligüe, reinforced on the inside with wooden posts, and covered with tule. The roof is of junquillo or of some grass similar to Peruvian feathergrass (paja brava).

The traditional ruca is round or oval, but it can also be rectangular or square. It has one principal entrance which faces East, expressing the Mapuche cosmological preference for Pwelmapu or Puel mapu, their eastern homelands. It may also have a small secondary entrance to the west.

Inside the ruca there are spaces for keeping provisions. They are traditionally decorated with domestic artifacts hung from the walls and ceiling. There are beds to the sides, and in the center is the hearth or kütralwe, which serves to cook food, provide light, and heat the ruca. The smoke, carrying grease from cooked foods, coat the interior of the ruca over time, creating a protective layer. The soot darkens the interior walls and often gives the ruca and surrounding area a distinctive smell. The kütralwe or hearth burns constantly in the center of the house, and is the home of Ngen-kütral, or the Mapuche fire spirit.

== Construction ==
Historically, when they wanted to construct a ruca, a Mapuche would request permission from the spirit Ngen-mapu so as to establish themself in this place, and they would notify a superior to inform the rest of the community. Thus, the future owner of the ruca would gather the necessary materials, while the people of the community would join in to build the ruca, a common labor known as rukatun or rukan.

To finish the work, there is a celebration with food prepared by the collaborators, and dancing with masks made from wood or collón.

== In media ==
Mapuche journalist and activist Pedro Cayuqueo published a book titled Esa ruca llamada Chile ("This Ruca Called Chile") in 2014. It is a collection of articles written from 2012 to 2014.
