= Catalonia (publisher) =

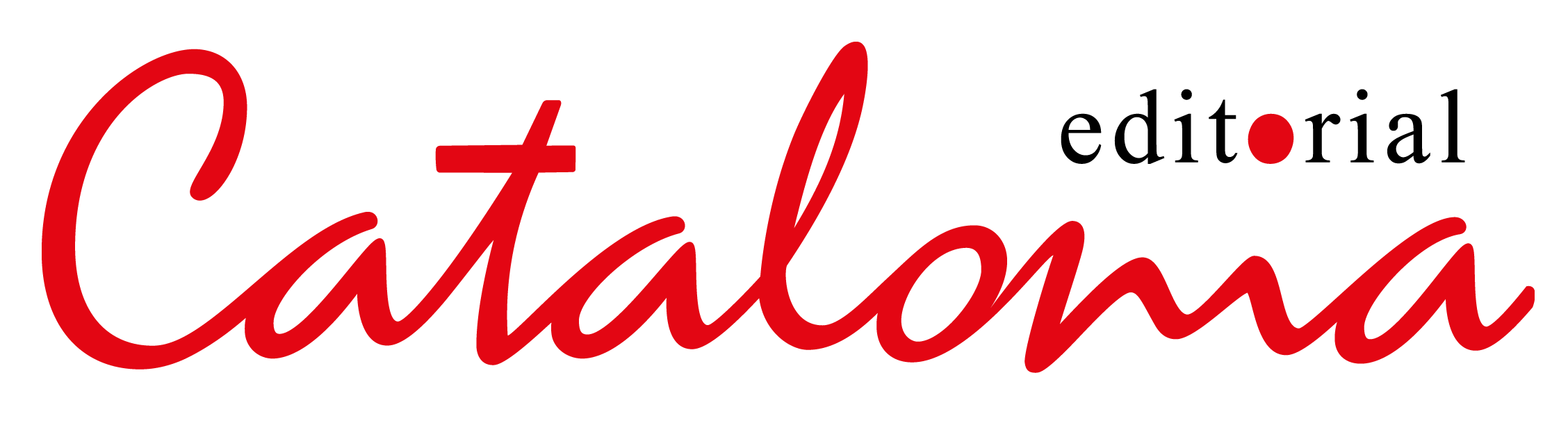
- Type: Private
- Industry: Book publishing
- Founded: 2003
- Founder: Arturo Infante Reñasco
- Area served: Chile
- Products: Books

Catalonia is a Chilean book publishing company based in Santiago. The company was founded by Arturo Infante Reñasco an editor active in Spain, Argentina and Chile, who in 2012 was ranked among the top-50 most influential Spanish language publishers. The company was founded in 2003.
