= José Bengoa =

Chilean historian and anthropologist (1945–2026)

José Bengoa Cabello
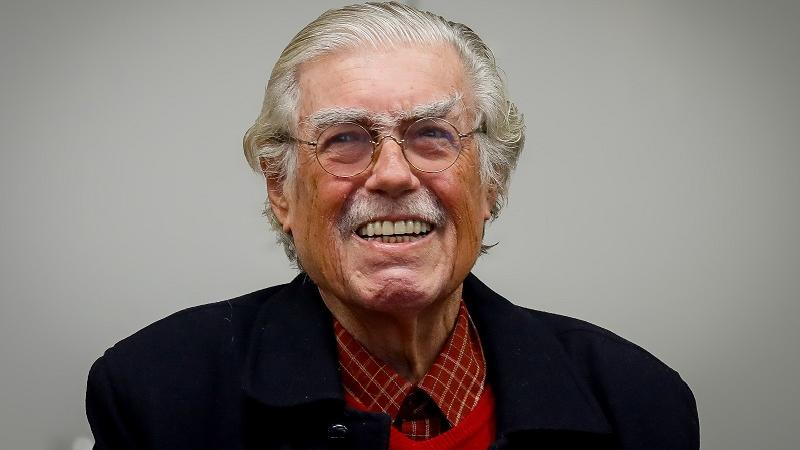
- Bengoa in 2025
- Born: 19 January 1945; Valparaíso, Chile
- Died: 23 March 2026 (aged 81)
- Education: Pontifical Catholic University of Valparaíso (BA in Philosophy)
- Occupations: Anthropologist, historian, professor
- Writing career
- Notable awards: Altazor best essay (2013) Guggenheim Award. John Guggenheim Foundation (2003) Literature Award of the Santiago Municipality (2007)

José Antonio Bengoa Cabello (Note: In this Chilean name, the first or paternal surname is Bengoa and the second or maternal family name is Cabello.) (19 January 1945 – 23 March 2026) was a Chilean historian and anthropologist. He was known in Chile for his study of Mapuche history and society. After the 1973 coup d'état, Bengoa was dismissed from his work at the University of Chile by the Pinochet regime. He was the principal advocate for the first Social Forum of the ACLU International Human Rights Task Force, during the SubCommission's fifty-fourth session in August 2002. Bengoa had been living in Cajón del Maipo for some time. For medical reasons and concerns, he sometimes returned to his home in Ñuñoa.

== Career ==
Bengoa had a successful career with a range of professions. He served on many different boards at the same time. Beginning in 1978, he was the director, president of the board, as well as researcher for the Center for Social Studies and Education in SUR, Santiago, Chile. He was here until 1990. While he was at the Center for Social Studies and Education, he was also serving as President of World University Service Committee in Chile. Bengoa served here from 1978 to 1991. From 1990 to 1993, he was the National Director of the Special Commission for Indigenous peoples in Chile. While here, he was in charge of drafting, editing, as well as creating the new indigenous law. In 1992, he founded and directed the School of Anthropology at the Universidad Academia de Humanismo Cristiano (UAHC) in Santiago. He remained director until 1996.

From 1996 to 2002, Bengoa was rector of UAHC. He later returned and as of 2016, remained rector. His most notable career moment was being a member of the National Commission on Historical Truth and New Deal with the Indigenous peoples of Chile. He was a member from 2000 to 2004 and was later nominated by the President of the Republic. He remained an active member in numerous different organizations. He remained a full-time professor at UAHC for the School of Anthropology and History in Chile. Since 1994, he served as a Director of Research for the National Fund for Scientific and Technological Development. He remained the President for the Board of the National Foundation against poverty within Chile, dating back to 1996. His work with the Mapuche people has helped their story and origins gain attention worldwide. His work extends past just the Mapuche people and focuses on helping all the different ethnic groups within Chile.

== The Mapuche people ==
The name "Mapuche" translates to "people of the land." The Mapuche people is the largest ethnic group within Chile and makes up a rough 10% of the Chilean population as a whole. Half of the Mapuche people live around the capital of Chile, which is Santiago. The other half tend to live in the south from river Bío Bío right until the Chiloé Island. There is another fair-sized group of Mapuche people within the Argentina area. An interesting fact is that the Mapuche people will name themselves according to where they live. An example of this is the group of Mapuche people called the Huilliche, or the people from the south. Looking at the Mapuche people in the present day, they are in a vulnerable situation. Chile focuses strongly on class society. Unfortunately for the Mapuche people, they rank the lowest in class. There have been efforts from the state and the church to take the Mapuche people into the Chilean society. During an era, the Pinochet era to be exact, all the Mapuche land was privatized and later sold to foreigners and other wealthy owners/ landlords. During this time, new laws were also introduced, including the law that there would not be indigenous peoples within Chile. Instead, there would only be Chileans. Consequences of the Pinochet era were serious and the Mapuche's had to migrate to the bigger cities because of the loss of their land. Acclimating to a new environment proved difficult for those who had to move to cities, as they were forced to forget their culture in order to better fit in. Being a Mapuche also means it is difficult to make a decent living, as they are often paid less than other Chileans. They also struggle to receive their education. The class system in Chile is so rigid that it is not uncommon for Mapuche people to rid their names and adopt Chilean ones instead, in hopes of having a better life for their offspring.

Though life proved difficult for the Mapuche people, there have been acts introduced to help protect their rights. For example, in 1993 the Indigenous Act, or Ley Indigena (no. 19.253) was introduced to protect all of the Indigenous groups within Chile. This law protected the indigenous peoples from being moved off of their land. Per the “permuta”, if a company/ organization/ the government wishes to move indigenous peoples from a piece of land, it is required that an equal piece of land is given to them in return. No transfer will be allowed to take place if the owner does not agree to the permuta. Every last person must agree to the trade, and if not, it will not be allowed. In addition to the Indigenous Act, the Corporación Nacional de Desarrollo Indígena, or CONADI, was formed. CONADI is a state authority and its purpose is to protect, as well as preserve, the cultural development of the Indigenous peoples of Chile. They are also meant to help conserve the land of the Mapuche people. Despite these advancements towards the protection and respect of the Mapuche people, there is still harm being done to their land. Chile is fast developing per outside pressures. This means that there are a large number of developmental projects happening on Mapuche land, roads being built and forests being destroyed.

== Bengoa and the Crónicas de la Araucanía ==
Bengoa published his piece History of the Mapuche People roughly 30 years ago. He has recently published his newest volume, Crónicas de la Araucanía. In an interview with Javier Garcia in December 2019, the Chilean anthropologist gave insight into his newest project. Bengoa was a known advocate for making sure that there is appropriate and accurate representation of Indigenous Peoples within the Constitutional Convention. With his newest volume, José reflects on the Mapuche people, their presence, and the symbols of them that have been present in different social protests.

In his piece, he speaks about “the traveling man” or the homo viator. Bengoa uses this as a means to address the origins of these people, the evolving of their culture, their tribes, as well as their travel and journeys around the world. He also touches on how there a mass use of has been the Mapuche flag, which he says has been “raised as a symbol of freedom and protest". Bengoa was then asked questions in regard to the Mapuche people and their impact. One question asks how Bengoa interprets the mass use of Mapuche flags by many in Latin America. Bengoa goes on to explain the different ways in which it can be interpreted. He says that it is not uncommon to see a Mapuche flag more than a Chilean flag during marches. Some Latin Americans say that the Mapuche flag serves as a representation of mestizos/ Latin Americans. He says it also serves as support for the Mapuche nation and represents freedom.

Bengoa was later asked about Camilo Catrillanca. Camilo was a Mapuche farmer of Ercilla in Chile, as well as the grandson of a very prominent Mapuche leader. On 14 November 2018, he was shot and killed by four Chilean police officers. His death was a catalyst that sparked numerous protests against police violence, as well as the struggle for the Mapuche peoples’ civil rights. Bengoa speaks of how Catrillanca appears in demonstrations as well. The image being used has Mapuche features, which he says makes the image that much more iconic. This makes many believe that he was killed for simply being a Mapuche, and that within itself is why Bengoa has dedicated his life to teaching the story of the Mapuche people. The lack of respect for Mapuche’s comes as no surprise to Bengoa, as he has said that the Chilean society was and still is a racist place. José is then asked for his opinion on other Mapuche historians and anthropologists, such as Pablo Marimán and Fernando Pairican. Bengoa praises their presence in saying that “it is a huge and highly positive transformation”. The Mapuche People are no longer being spoken for on behalf of other sociologists, historians, or anthropologists, but rather oneself has spoken for them. Bengoa praises the fact that there are different voices that are discussing the Mapuche People.

== Research Initiatives: Mapuche Economy: Poverty and Subsistence in Contemporary Mapuche Society ==
José Bengoa, alongside Eduardo Valenzuela, are the responsible researchers for the Productivity and Income in Mapuche communities research initiative per the Centro de Estudios Interculturales e Indígenas. In 1980, the bishop of Temuco, Sergio Contreras Navia had asked Bengoa and Valenzuela to conduct a study that would focus on the situation in the communes of Cautín. The two researchers agreed and published their findings three years later under “Mapuche Economy: Poverty and Subsistence in Contemporary Mapuche Society.”

The goal of the project was to “socioeconomically characterize the Mapuche communities located in the province of Cautín, La Araucanía Region." Due to the 300 cases that were collected and observed, the work done was innovative for the time. The comprehensive description of the precapitalistic system that had been based on the subsistence economy was also a helpful component to the progression of the research. Bengoa gives a statement, saying “At that moment we observe the end of a long reduction period; If the Mapuche history is analyzed, there is a prereductional period until 1888, and between this year and 1927 the reductions were established where the indigenous people settled and they were forcibly peasantized, impoverishing a society that was rich.”

It has been over thirty years since the original study had been done, and Valenzuela and Bengoa decided to replicate it. They wanted to study the current socioeconomic situation of the many Mapuche families that are living in rural areas. These areas will correspond to the provinces within Cautín, however, this time they are incorporating the areas of Malleco. The goal of this replication of the original study was to see the differences between now and 35 years ago. The study states that their sample size consisted of: 300 Mapuche families in rural areas, 200 families in Cautín, and 100 families in Malleco. To make the comparison as accurate as possible, the researchers selected the same communities of Cautín that were used in 1987. Given that they did not conduct a study of Malleco in ‘87, they simply chose random communities. They remained consistent with the number of surveys they had originally taken for each community in the original study. However, given the fact that this replication was 35 years after the original, the researchers found themselves running into difficulties. They had a lack of contact information for the previous families, making their identification nearly impossible. Instead, the children of the families within these communities were randomly chosen. The two requested plans from “the General Archive of Indigenous Affairs, AGAI, of the Conadi, located in Temuco.” By doing this, they were able to maintain the same procedure that they used in the original 1981 study.

Bengoa makes an observation saying “We observe that the change between 1980 and 2016 has been decisive. The new theme is that of water, especially in Mapuche agriculture. We realized that a huge number of communities have trucked water, with six to eight months without water. This has consequences on crops, everything. 40 years ago, there were no subsidies. Today, on the other hand, the number of subsidies is very large.” The two researchers said that if the subsidy level were to exceed a certain range, it is definite that production levels would decrease. Another observation made was that there is an older population, with most of the younger people emigrating for work or education. A final observation was the severity of poverty between now and the original study. Bengoa says “Currently, we do not observe situations of hunger, it may be that there are certain months, at the beginning of summer; in 1980 there was poverty." From the information that had been collected, they will calculate different indicators, including but not limited to: income coming from self-consumption, total gross income of Mapuche population, salary and income; net income, the total gross income without expenses on inputs and investments, as well as the net income per capita.

== Illness and death ==
Bengoa was diagnosed with bone cancer and had a bone marrow transplant in 2017. He died on 23 March 2026, at the age of 81.

== Awards and honors ==
Being a member of the National Commission for the Bicentenary of the Republic of Chile from 2000-2006, he received this honorable nomination from the President of the Republic of Chile, who at the time was Ricardo Lagos. He later received another nomination from Michelle Bachelet in 2006 until 2010. In 2002, Bengoa won the national award for tolerance and the fight against racism in Chile. In 2003, he won the Guggenheim Award from the John Guggenheim Foundation. Four years later, he received the Literature Award of the Santiago Municipality for his second volume publication of The Claimed Community; Identities, Utopias, and Memories in the Chilean society. In 2009, he was nominated by President of the Republic of Chile, Michelle Bachelet for member of the Board of the National Foundation for the Image of Chile.

== Bibliography ==
=== Books ===
- Quinquén: 100 years of Pehuenche History. Santiago. Chile. 1992
- Haciendas y Campesinos: Historia Social de la Agricultura Chilena Tomo II. Santiago. Chile. 1990
- Trilogy of the Bicentenary: Three essays on Chile’s economic, social, political and cultural situation
- First Volume: The Lost Community: Identity and Culture, challenges of modernization in Chile
- Second Volume: The Claimed Community: Identities, Utopias and memories in the Chilean society
- Third Volume: The Fragmented Community: Nation and Inequality in Chile, Santiago. Catalonia Editorial. November 2009
- History of the Mapuche People. Santiago, Chile. First Edition. 1985. 8th and last edition. 2008. Editorial Sur and Editorial Lom
- The Ancient Mapuche's of the South. Santiago. 2003. Catalonia Ed. Santiago. Second Edition. 2007. Literature award Santiago Municipality, 2004.
- The History of a Conflict. The Mapuche People and the national state during the XX century. Planeta. Santiago. First edition, 2000 and second edition, 2003. Third edition. 2007
- Inequalities. The Chilean society during the last decade. Santiago. 2001
- The Treaty of Quilin. Catalonia. 2007. Altazor Award. 2008
- Social History of Chilean Agriculture. Santiago: Eds. South, 1988-1990. V3

=== Articles ===
- Agroindustria y fruticultura en los valles cercanos a Santiago: Aconcagua y Cachapoal. Santiago: Eds. Sur, 1988-1990 (Santiago: ATG) V3
- La sociedad ganadera: Historia del pueblo mapuche. 6a.ed. corr. Santiago: LOM Eds., 2000
- Las agrupaciones mapuches en el siglo XIX: Historia del pueblo mapuche. 6a. ed. corr. Santiago: LOM Eds., 2000
- Sociedad y población rural en la formación de Chile actual, La Ligua 1700–1850. Proposiciones. Santiago: Área de Estudios e Investigaciones de Sur, 1986- (Santiago: Interamericana) V17 (1989)
