= 1851 Chilean revolution =

Failed attempt to overthrow Chile's government

1851 Chilean Revolution
Date	April 20 – December 31, 1851
Location	Chile
Result	Chilean government victory

Belligerents
(Chile) Chilean Government: Chilean Army; Chilean Navy; Conservative Party	Liberal rebels; Mapuche allies

Commanders and leaders
Manuel Montt; Antonio Varas; Manuel Bulnes; José María del Canto Marín de Poveda; Benjamín Muñoz Gamero	José María de la Cruz; Pedro Urriola Balbontín; José Miguel Carrera Fontecilla; Benjamín Vicuña Mackenna; Victorino Garrido; Francisco Bilbao; Mañil; José Miguel Cambiazo

Casualties and losses
- 2,000 to 4,000 men

The Revolution of 1851 was an attempt by Chilean liberals to overthrow the conservative government of president Manuel Montt and repeal the Chilean Constitution of 1833. After various battles and sieges, by late December 1851 government forces had subdued the revolutionaries.

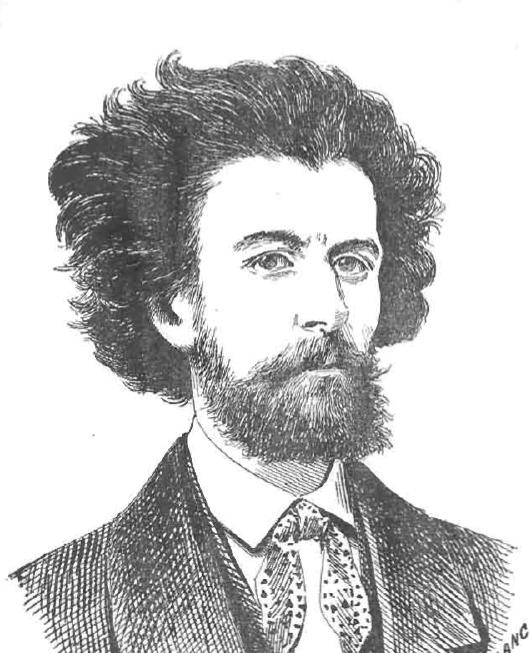
Francisco Bilbao, member of the revolutionary side

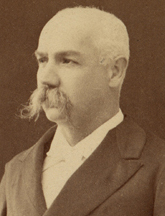
Benjamín Vicuña Mackenna, opponent and persecuted politician

== Background ==
After the Battle of Lircay ended the Chilean Civil War of 1829–30, Chile formed a conservative political system under the 1833 Constitution, drafted by Mariano Egaña, which established a one-party presidential polity. In the succeeding decades, various liberal social and political movements emerged, led by intellectuals like Santiago Arcos, Francisco Bilbao, José Victorino Lastarria and Benjamín Vicuña Mackenna. These and others formed institutions such as the Literary Society of 1842 and the Society of Equality, which sought to rally the population to achieve an increase in civil rights. During the 1840s many small newspapers began to appear in Chile such as, Guerra a la Tiranía, which used language that facilitated violence among liberal social groups throughout Chile. Other newspapers such as El Semanario and El Mercurio, two popular newspapers at the time, began to denounce these new slanderous newspapers such as Guerra a la Tiranía in order to stop their dangerous journalism from further dividing political parties. The European Revolutions of 1848 also inspired and encouraged opposition political movements, who increasingly saw armed action as the most realistic means of forcing political change.·

== 1851 Election and Uprisings ==
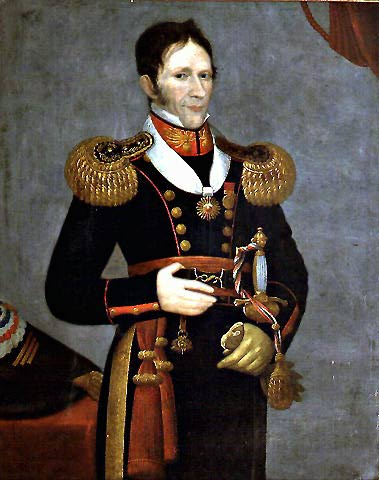
José María de la Cruz, opposition presidential candidate and leader of the revolution

=== 20 April uprising ===
In early 1851, the opposition advanced candidate José María de la Cruz in the presidential election to oppose then-president Manuel Bulnes's preferred successor, Manuel Montt. Concerned that the election might not end in their favor, Cruz and other opposition groups decided to attempt a military coup, to be carried out in Santiago by Colonel Pedro Urriola Balbontín.

At dawn on 20 April, Urriola and his companions seized the main streets of Santiago and stormed the army barracks to arm more men, but few of the soldiers they had hoped for joined in the uprising. Two loyalist battalions organized to face the rebels and prepared a counteroffensive from the Alameda and Santa Lucia Hill. The fighting lasted about five hours, after which Urriola was killed along with more than 200 others.

=== 25–26 June presidential elections ===
When the government announced that Montt had won the election by a wide margin, Cruz accused the regime of electoral fraud and declared the election void. He also alleged that government agents were conspiring to assassinate him, but the men accused were acquitted by the Chilean courts. After that Cruz withdrew to Concepción from Santiago. Small protests began in Concepción, Coquimbo and Maule, which would gradually escalate into open rebellion. In the meantime, the government began arresting political opponents.

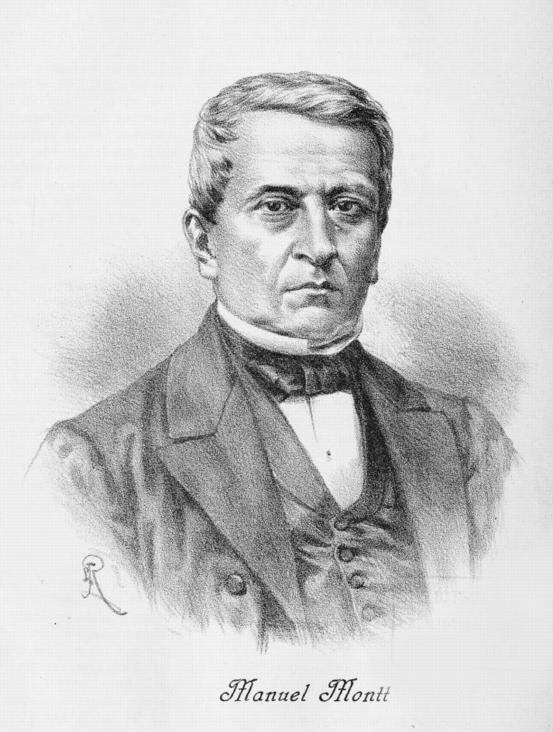
Manuel Montt

=== September uprisings ===
Days before Manuel Montt assumed power on 18 September 1851, dissident uprisings seized power in Concepción and La Serena. According to historian Alberto Edwards the uprising was not only rooted in liberalism but also in provincialism.

The revolution in La Serena was led by Pedro Pablo Muñoz, the brothers Antonio and Ignacio Alfonso, and other notable residents of the city, who organized a revolutionary militia of 600 men from La Serena, Ovalle and Illapel. Calling themselves the "Restorers of the North," they were commanded by José Miguel Carrera Fontecilla. A revolutionary government was formed in the city, declaring the abolition of the Constitution of 1833. After a defeat by government forces in the Battle of Petorca, the city was besieged.

The uprising in Concepción, by contrast, had little to do with liberalism, as José María de la Cruz and other Concepción strongmen were pelucones (conservatives). Instead, historian Fernando Silva (1974) claims that the election of Montt meant the loss of the political hegemony Concepción had enjoyed in the 1829–1851 period under the presidents José Joaquín Prieto and Manuel Bulnes, both of whom were from that city. Because of this the Concepción elite would have supported the overthrow of the Montt regime. Cruz armed a group of four thousand men, including liberal supporters, rebel troops, mountaineers, and warriors of the Mapuche chieftain Mañil. According to historian José Bengoa, the Mapuches saw the central government in Santiago as their main enemy, explaining their participation on the side of Cruz in the Concepción-based revolt. Cruz had previously been in charge of the Army of the South and had helped to prevent a possible Mapuche-Chilean war arising from the wreck of Joven Daniel in 1849.

=== Later uprisings ===
On 28 October another uprising began in Valparaíso, led by artisans of the Society of Brotherhood (the surviving local chapter of Society of Equality). The Valparaíso mutiny was led by Rafael Bilbao and José Antonio Riquelme.

On 21 November a Chilean naval officer named José Miguel Cambiazo led a mutiny in Punta Arenas, which was eventually put down by the Chilean navy.

=== End of the revolution ===
Meanwhile, the revolution was still raging in the north. However, the defeat of the Liberals in Petorca made them remain in the Province of Coquimbo, while some mining businessmen favoring the Government, decided to create a counterrevolutionary army under the command of Ignacio José Prieto.

In the meantime, a Government army detachment under the command of Juan Vidaurre-Leal Morla and Victorino Garrido landed in Papudo and headed towards the province of Coquimbo with 4,000 soldiers. These joined Prieto and marched to La Serena, a city that had barely 1,000 men for its defense, under the command of José Miguel Carrera Fontecilla, son of the Father of the Nation of the same name. Even so, the Liberals continued their resistance. After the defeat of the Concepción revolutionaries in the Battle of Loncomilla on 8 December, the Revolution had lost its drive and was reduced to an isolated stronghold in the city of La Serena.
However, on 26 December, a revolution broke out in Copiapó by the forces under the command of Bernardino Barahona. Most of the soldiers who defended La Serena, moved north to support this new revolution. At the end of December, La Serena, with its empty trenches, was easily occupied by Government forces, without an armistice having been negotiated between the both sides.
On 8 January 1852, the Revolutionary forces of Copiapó were defeated in Linderos de Ramadilla by the Chilean army, ending the uprising in the provinces.

== Consequences of the Revolution ==
After the failure of the Revolution, the government of Montt began a program of political persecution against the instigators of the uprisings, led by his minister Antonio Varas, which included arrests and deportations. Dozens of notable government opponents were driven into exile, including Arcos, Bilbao, Lastarria and Vicuña Mackenna. Between 2,000 and 4,000 men had died in the fighting.

A major rift developed within Chile's political opposition, dividing them into a group headed by Francisco Bilbao, who called for renewed armed revolution, and one headed by Aubrey, seeking a return to democracy by an institutional route.

== Bibliography ==
- Behnke, Harold Nagel (1994). "Capitán de fragata Benjamín Muñoz Gamero (1817–1851)" (PDF). Revista de Marina (in Spanish). Vol. 6. pp. 1–8. Archived (PDF) from the original on 2014-05-24.
- Bengoa, José (2000) [1985]. Historia del pueblo mapuche: Siglo XIX y XX [Mapuche History: Nineteenth and Twentieth Centuries]. Biblioteca del bicentenario (in Spanish) (6th ed.). Santiago de Chile: LOM Ediciones. ISBN 978-956-282-232-9.
- Edwards, Alberto (1932). El Gobierno de don Manuel Montt, 1851-1861 [The Government of Manuel Montt, 1851-1861] (PDF) (in Spanish). Santiago de Chile: Editorial Nascimiento. LCCN 33030202. OL 6296372M.
- Gazmuri, Cristián (1999). El "48" Chileno: Igualitarios, Reformistas, Radicales, Masones y Bomberos [The Chilean "48": Egalitarians, Reformists, Radicals, Masons and Firefighters] (PDF) (in Spanish). Santiago de Chile: Editorial Universitaria. ISBN 9789561108080. OCLC 82644737.
- Muñoz Sougarret, Jorge (2010). "El naufragio del bergantín Joven Daniel, 1849. El indígena en el imaginario histórico de Chile". Tiempo Histórico (in Spanish) (1): 133–148. doi:10.25074/th.v0i1.174. ISSN 0718-7432.
- Silva V., Fernando (1974). "La Organización Nacional" [National Organization]. In Villalobos R., Sergio; Silva G., Osvaldo; Silva V., Fernando; Estelle M., Patricio (eds.). Historia de Chile [History of Chile] (in Spanish) (14th ed.). Santiago de Chile: Editorial Universitaria. ISBN 978-956-11-1163-9. LCCN 75527429. OCLC 1259676.
- Thomas, Jack Ray (July 1979). "The Role of the Press in the Chilean Rebellion of 1851". The Americas. 36 (1): 59–78. doi:10.2307/981138. JSTOR 981138. S2CID 147478972.
