= Literary Society of 1842 =

Group of prominent Chileans

The Literary Society of 1842 (Spanish: Sociedad Literaria de 1842) was a group of prominent Chileans from the social, political, and literary fields. Its goals were promoting originality among the nation's writers, strengthening the social quality of literature, and rejecting foreign literary models. The group held 86 meetings from 5 March 1842 to 1 August 1843.

== Members ==
It had over 40 members, including the following:

- Andrés Bello
- Juan Bello
- Álvaro Covarrubias
- Andrés Chacón
- Jacinto Chacón
- Juan N. Espejo
- Hermógenes Irisarri
- José Victorino Lastarria
- Santiago Lindsay
- Francisco Bilbao
- Manuel Antonio Matta
- Anacleto Montt
- Pedro Palazuelos
- Aníbal Pinto
- Alejandro Reyes
- Salvador Sanfuentes
- José M. Torres
- Cristóbal Valdés
- Wenceslao Vial Guzmán

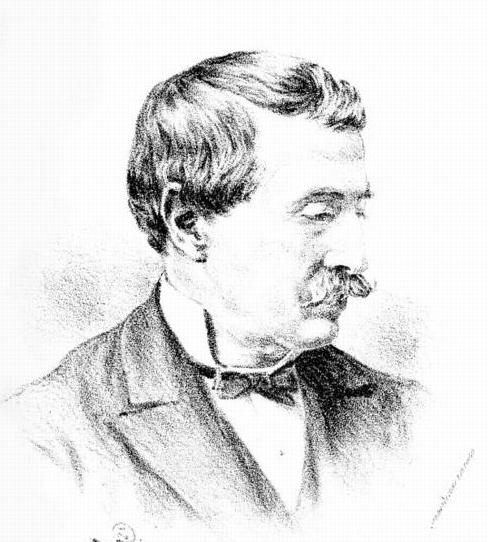
José Victorino Lastarria
