= MSVS =

MSVS may refer to:

- Microsoft Visual Studio
- Medium Support Vehicle System, a Canadian Forces truck
