= Chilean Marine Corps =

- Cuerpo de Infantería de Marina de Chile
- Coat of arms of Chilean Marine Corps
- Founded: 1817; 209 years ago
- Country: Chile
- Type: • Marines • Commandos • Special forces
- Role: Expeditionary warfare; Amphibious warfare; Coastal defense; Military security; Reconnaissance; Raid (military); Disaster relief
- Size: 5,500+ men (2022)
- Part of: Chilean Navy
- Garrison/HQ: Concón, Chile
- Nickname: "Cossacks"
- Mottos: "Fortis Atque Fidelis" (Latin) (English: "Strong and Loyal") (Spanish: "Fuerte a la vez que Fieles")
- Colours: Scarlet Red, Blue and Yellow
- March: "Himno de la Infantería de Marina" (Spanish) (English: "Marine Corps Anthem") "Torreones de Oro" (Spanish) (English: "Golden Towers") "Honores a los Caídos" (Spanish) (English: "Honors to the Fallen") "Bravos soldados del mar" (Spanish) (English: "Brave soldiers of the sea")
- Anniversaries: 16 June (Note: On 16 June 1818, the supreme director of Chile, Bernardo O'Higgins, signed a decree assigning a Marine Corps. This decree is not related to a formal creation of what we now call the Marine Corps, since they had already been operating in the Chilean Navy since 1817, but by resolution of this naval institution it has been established on 16 June to celebrate its anniversary.)
- Engagements: Spanish American wars of independence; War of the Confederation; Revolution of 1851; Occupation of Araucanía; Chincha Islands War; War of the Pacific; Chilean Civil War of 1891; Beagle conflict
- Website: www.infanteriademarina.cl

Commanders
- Current general commander: Rear Admiral Jorge Keitel Villagrán
- Notable figures: Guillermo Miller; Jaime Charles; Antonio Hurtado; Juan de Dios Aldea

Insignia
- Flag

The Chilean Marine Corps (Spanish: Cuerpo de Infantería de Marina, CIM) is an entity of the Chilean Navy special forces which specializes in amphibious assaults.

== History ==
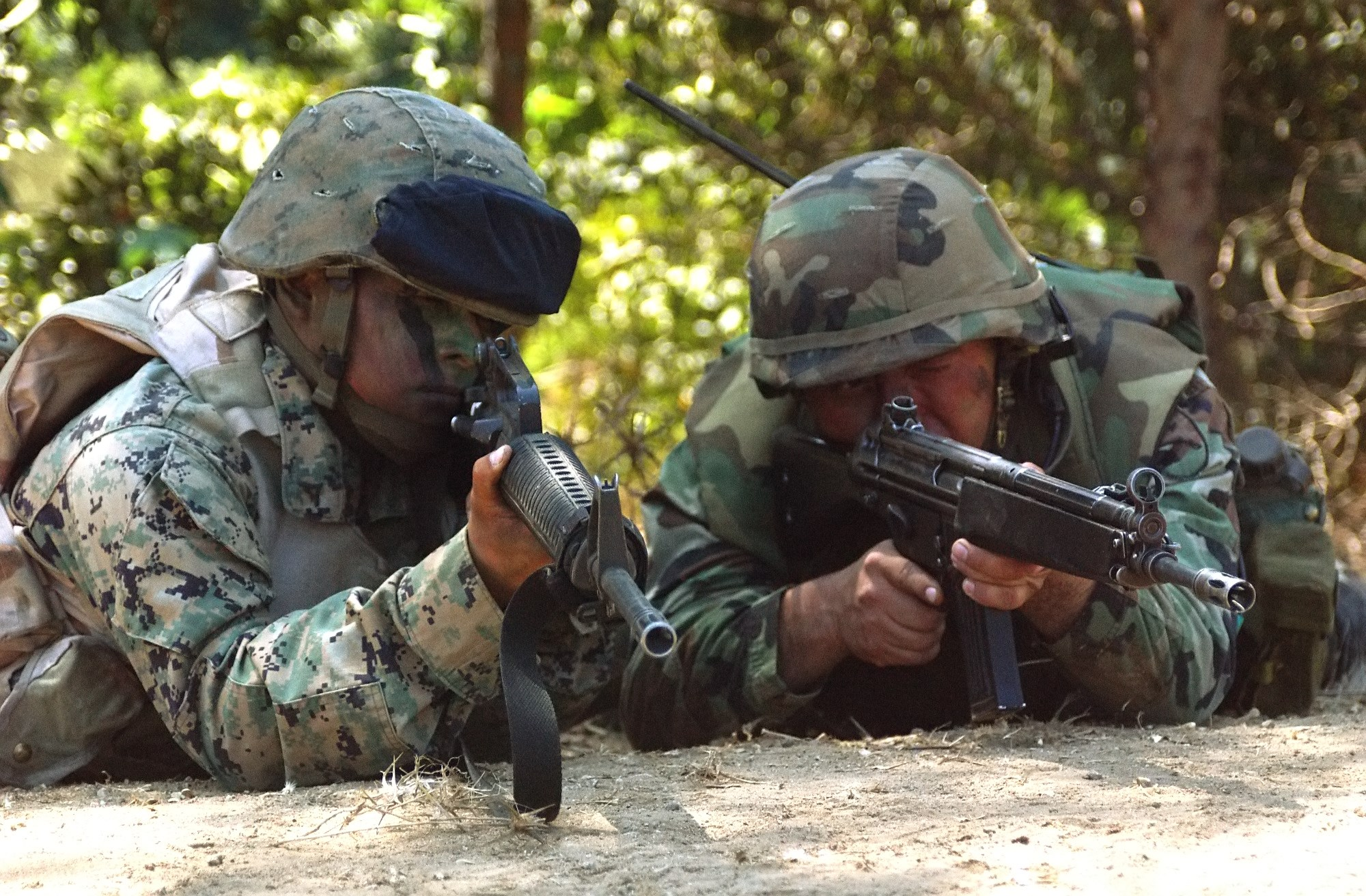
A Chilean Marine aiming the HK33A2 during training alongside U.S. Marines.

The Marine Corps was born with the establishment of the first armed forces of an independent Chile: the Corps was founded by Don Bernardo O'Higgins Riquelme on June 16, 1818, through a Supreme Decree. However, the predecessor of the Marine Corps in Chilean history may be found in the early efforts of patriot revolutionaries against Spain in challenging royal control of the sea. In fact, a force of twenty-five soldiers Cazadores de los Andes, aboard the brig "Aguila" constituted the embryo of the Marines, who have since participated in all the actions to which Chilean warships have been committed.

O'Higgins's Supreme Decree described the role of the Marines: "these people will fire rifles from the deck, [and] will handle the machete in boardings and bayonet and cannon in landings." The Marine Corps thus became an indispensable complement to the sailors of the Navy, whose primary responsibility was to properly maneuver their craft during combat.

== Mission and later history ==
"To provide the operational commander of Marines forces organized, equipped and trained, with the aim of contributing to the projection of naval power, to defend the coast and internal security and institutional."

In other words, it consists mainly of amphibious assault force, coastal defense force, special forces, support organs and garrisons.

It also organizes, equips and trains them to develop in times of conflict operations and actions that are characteristic over territory or where necessary, as irreplaceable component of the naval power of the nation, contributing effectively to safeguard the sovereignty and territorial integrity.

The Marines were to move in line with the means available to the Chilean Navy. The advent of steam ships and the longer range of the artillery, and many other circumstances, ensured fighting occurred at a greater distances; Collisions were becoming increasingly impractical and rifles on the deck, unnecessary. For that reason was the predominant role of gunner and the Marine Corps became Artillery Battalion of the Navy.

In 1866, the members of this battalion had to cover the garrisons of warships and fortifications on the ground. In such condition they all subsequently participated in all actions of the Naval War of the Pacific, displaying extraordinary courage and aggressiveness.

This war highlighted the Chilean Disembark in Pisagua, the first amphibious assault of the modern era. Amphibious operations were conducted on November 2, 1879, where the Chilean squadron provided escort and naval fire support, while the landing forces composed by 9,000 men landed in Caleta Pisagua and captured the position in a fast offensive action, taking only 4 hours. The Peruvian forces, after a strong initial resistance, were defeated due to the strong and sustained aggressiveness shown by the Chilean soldiers.

Since 1887, it functions as coastal artillery. Such a definition of the mission led to the updating of Organic Regulations of the Corps, which in 1938 was defined as Coastal defense.

Beginning in 1964, the Corps was completely reorganized and refocused, being renamed the Marine Corps and constituting a modern amphibious force which has continued to evolve in line with the requirements of the institution to have a real amphibious capacity and capable of contributing on projecting naval power over hostile territory

The other mission of the Marines is the protection, maintenance and monitoring of the naval facilities, the most famous being The Lions Gate with its security unit under the order and security detachment of the Marines in Talcahuano (main naval base Chile) is responsible for maintaining order and security inside the naval base and naval populations.

== Organization ==
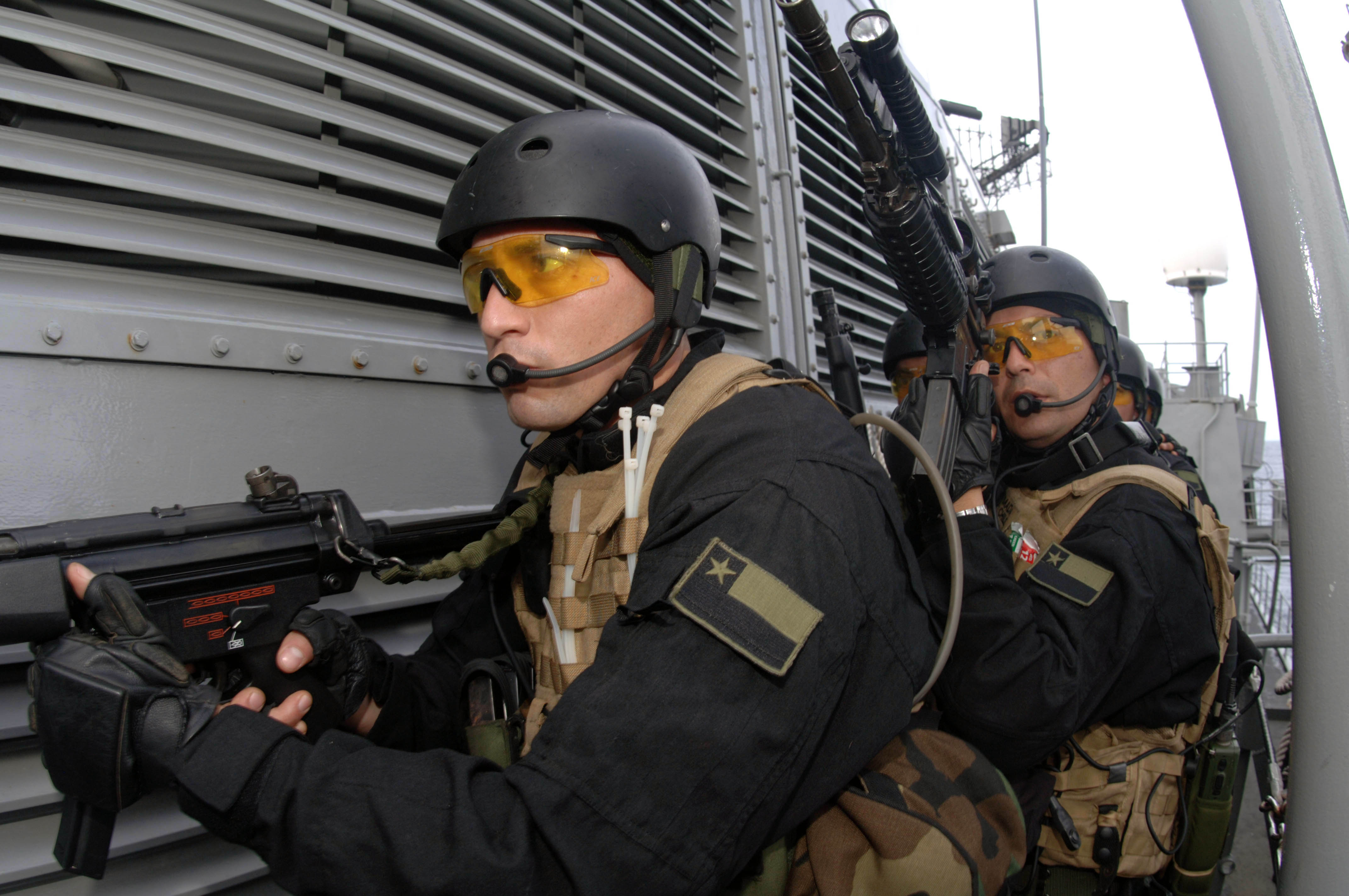
Fuerzas Especiales.

The Chilean Marines are organized into two battalion-sized detachments (Destacamento de Infantería), two full-time battalions plus support units. As of 2013 they are now a full division-sized formation of 2 brigades plus independent units.

=== Expeditionary Amphibious Brigade ===
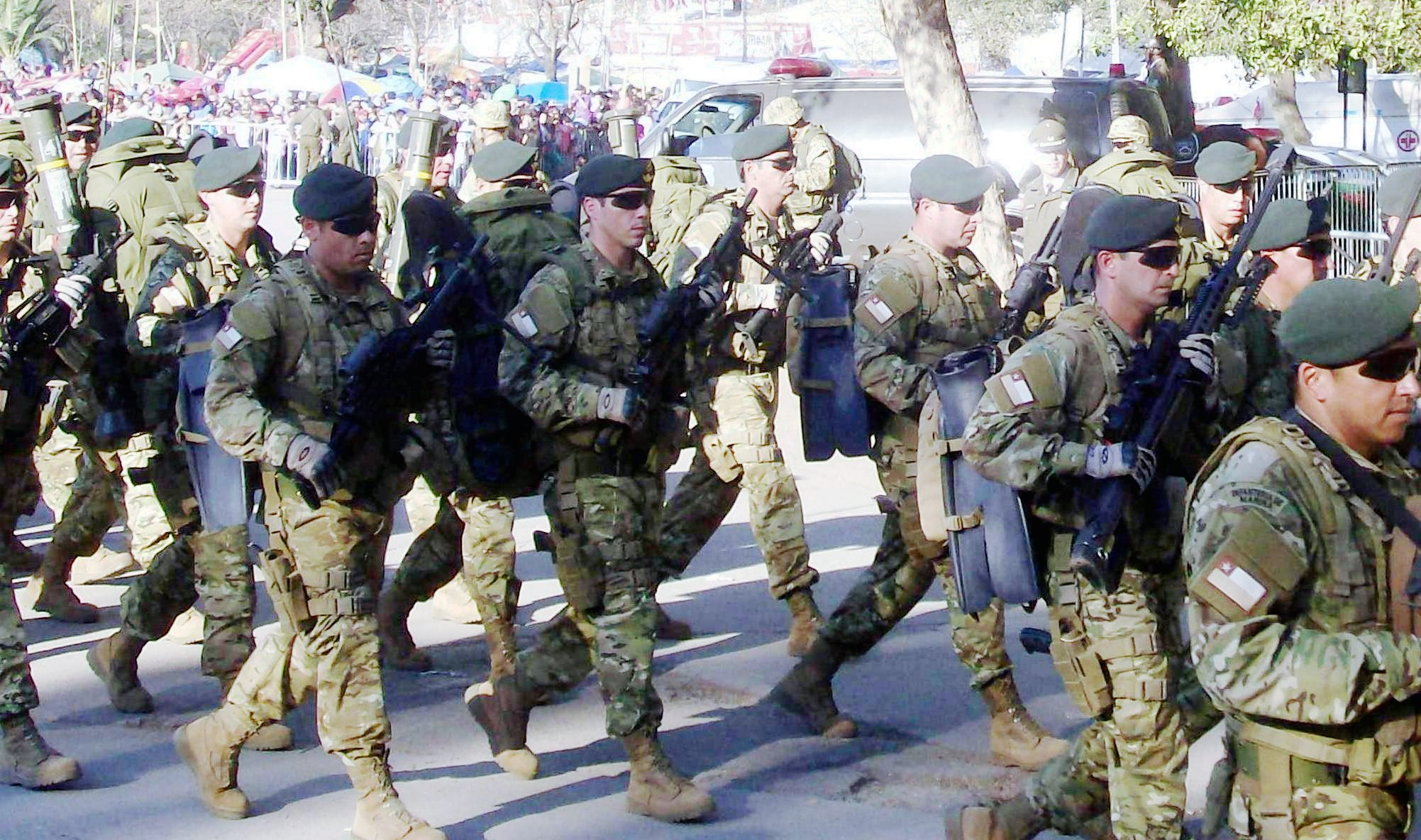
Infantes de Marina de la Brigada Expedicionaria Anfibia.

The Expeditionary Amphibious Brigade (Brigada Anfibia Expedicionaria, BAE), forms the amphibious component of the Corps with a mission to support the armed services in peacekeeping missions of in times of conflict and can do operations adaptable to any terrain possible. The brigade is headquartered in the Marine Corps bases in Concon and Talcahuano.

- Brigade Headquarters'
- Headquarters Company
- 21st Marine Battalion "Miller"
- 31st Marine Battalion "Aldea"
- 41st Marine Combat Support Battalion "Hurtado"
- 51st Marine Logistic Battalion

=== Protection Forces ===
The two remaining Marine Detachments plus smaller independent units form the Protection Forces of the Corps. Their duty is the protection of national territory and all naval bases and installations.

- 1st Marine Detachment "Lynch" (Destacamento de Infantería de Marina Nº 1 Lynch), stationed at Fort Condell, Punta Gruesa south of Iquique (4th Naval Zone): Its main function is to provide artillery and coastal defense, with batteries of howitzers and Excalibur missiles. It depends directly on its respective Naval Zone, due to its border location.
- 4th Marine Detachment "Cochrane"(Destacamento de Infantería de Marina Nº 4 "Cochrane"), located in Río de los Ciervos south of Punta Arenas (3rd Naval Zone): This Marine Detachment has similar characteristics to the 1st Marine Detachment because of its border location. It specialises in coastal defense and the use of artillery.

=== Other units ===
Each zone has a "Naval Detachment of Order and Security" (Destacamento de Orden y Seguridad in Spanish) that acts as base garrison unit and military police force. There are smaller detachments in remote areas like Puerto Williams and Isla de Pascua. The CIM also is responsible for the protection of the commander in chief of the Navy and contributes a section to the security of the facilities of the Ministry of Defense in Santiago. The corps also operates the Marine Infantry School "Commander Jaime Charles" together with the Naval Educational Command of the Navy, which fully owns and maintains the institution, and it is a part of the Naval Polytechnical Academy.

The Band Service of the Chilean Navy personnel are from the Marine Corps, particularly the military bands of the Naval School "Arturo Prat", the Seaman Training School "Alejandro Navarette Cisterna" and the Naval Polytechnic Academy. Like their counterparts in the British Royal Marines Band Service, they operate not just as headquarters bands for the 5 naval zones and 4 marine battalions, plus as in-house band for the Marine Infantry School and for the BE "Esmeralda", but also as bands for the naval educational institutions, even though in the naval bands sailors and officer/NCO cadets fill the ranks of the Corps of Drums which are attached to the bands and are composed of snare drums, fifes and bugles (in the marine bands soldiers of the Marines fill the Corps of Drums rosters). They all report to Headquarters, Chilean Marine Corps and are under the direct control of the Commander-in-Chief of the Navy. These bands date back to the mid 19th century when the Marine Artillery band was raised to provide musical support for the Navy.

The Marine Corps is also active in bomb disposal efforts as part of its international responsibilities.

== Equipment ==
=== Armoured vehicles ===
Name	Origin	Type	Image	Details
BV-206D (VT-206) / M-973	(Sweden) SE / (Chile) CL	Tracked articulated vehicle		The first vehicles arrived in 1988. Some of these vehicles were assembled by Cardoen Industries.
FV101 Scorpion	(United Kingdom) UK	Light tank of reconnaissance		In 1993 steps were taken in the United Kingdom that concluded with the acquisition of 12 second-hand units. In 2008, these units were replaced by 15 second-hand units from Spain. These latter units are modified and have a 200 hp Perkins T6/3544 six-cylinder diesel engine and optronic systems consisting of a laser rangefinder, night vision devices and an electronic calculator.
M1151/M1152 HMMWV	United States.	Armoured tactical vehicle		4x4 vehicles acquired after the acquisition of the M998 HMMWV in 2006. Armed with Mk 19 grenade launcher and Browning M2 HB machine gun. These vehicles partly replaced the PVPs that had been acquired in 2009 and then gradually transferred to Carabineros de Chile.
LAV III (NZLAV)	(Canada) CANADA	Light armoured vehicle		22 second-hand 8x8 units purchased in New Zealand in April 2022. They will be delivered in two batches, one in 2022 and one in 2023. Vehicles armed with a M242 Bushmaster cannon as primary weapon and two FN MAG machine guns as secondary weapons.
Kia KLTV181/182	(South Korea) KOR	Armoured tactical vehicle		4x4 vehicles of the troop transport version acquired in December 2022.

=== Howitzers ===
Name	Origin	Type	Cartridge	Image	Details
KH-178	(South Korea) KOR	Towed howitzer	105 mm		16 howitzers that were acquired in 1991. Used by the Combat Support Battalion No. 41 Hurtado of the BAE.
G-4	Israel.	Towed howitzer	155 mm		24 howitzers that were acquired second-hand from South Africa in 1992. Used for coastal defense by Marine Infantry Detachments No. 1 Lynch and No. 4 Cochrane. Mercedes-Benz Zetros MB 1833 4x4 trucks are used to tow them.

=== Anti-armor weapons ===
Name	Origin	Type	Cartridge	Image	Details
M72 LAW	United States.	Rocket-propelled grenade	66 mm		In 2018, a new variant of this weapon was reported to be in service.
AT4	(Sweden) SE	Anti-tank weapon	84 mm		—

=== Anti-ship weapons ===
Name	Origin	Type	Image	Details
Excalibur	(United Kingdom) UK	Anti-ship missile		A coastal defense version that was developed in the United Kingdom and deployed to Gibraltar from 1985 to 1997. It uses Exocet MM-38 ground-launched missiles. In 1993 steps were taken that concluded with the acquisition of a battery for the Chilean Marine Corps. In 2019, it is still reported to be in service with Marine Infantry Detachment No. 1 Lynch for coastal defense roles.

== See also ==
- Marines

== Sources ==
- Aranda Mora, Eduardo (May–June 2018). "El Cuerpo de Infantería de Marina, una tradición bicentenaria" (PDF). Revista de Marina (in Spanish). 135 (964). Viña del Mar, Chile.
- Álvarez Ebner, Miguel (December 2007). "Los soldados del mar en la Armada de Chile (síntesis histórica de la Infanteria de Marina de Chile)" (PDF). Academia de Historia Naval y Marítima de Chile (in Spanish). Valparaíso, Chile.
- Toledo Leal, Guillermo (November–December 1999). "Continuidad histórica y orgánica de la infantería de marina de la Armada de Chile" (PDF). Revista de Marina (in Spanish). 116 (853). Viña del Mar, Chile.
- Álvarez Ebner, Miguel (July–August 2015). "Las fuerzas de proyección en la historia de Chile" (PDF). Revista de Marina (in Spanish). 132 (947). Viña del Mar, Chile.
- Álvarez Ebner, Miguel (June 2000). "Los "soldados del mar" en las campañas de la Guerra del Pacífico (1879 – 1881)" (PDF). Academia de Historia Naval y Marítima de Chile (in Spanish). Valparaíso, Chile.
- Hardy Videla, David (November–December 1998). "El Cuerpo de Infantería de Marina durante las campañas de Antofagasta y Tarapacá de 1879" (PDF). Revista de Marina (in Spanish). 115 (847). Viña del Mar, Chile.
- Del Real Pérez, Cristián; Rivera Silva, Eduardo (July–August 2011). "Dependencia orgánica de la infantería de marina y del sargento 2º Juan de Dios Aldea Fonseca" (PDF). Revista de Marina (in Spanish). 128 (923). Viña del Mar, Chile.
- Sánchez Urra, Francisco (January 2020). Los soldados del mar en acción: la Infantería de Marina y la defensa de la soberanía austral (1958-1978) (PDF) (in Spanish) (10 ed.). Chile: Colección Historia Militar y Pensamiento Estratégico. ISBN 978-956-9839-08-5.
