= M35 series 2½-ton 6×6 cargo truck =

US military truck

Truck, Cargo, 2½-ton, 6×6, M35
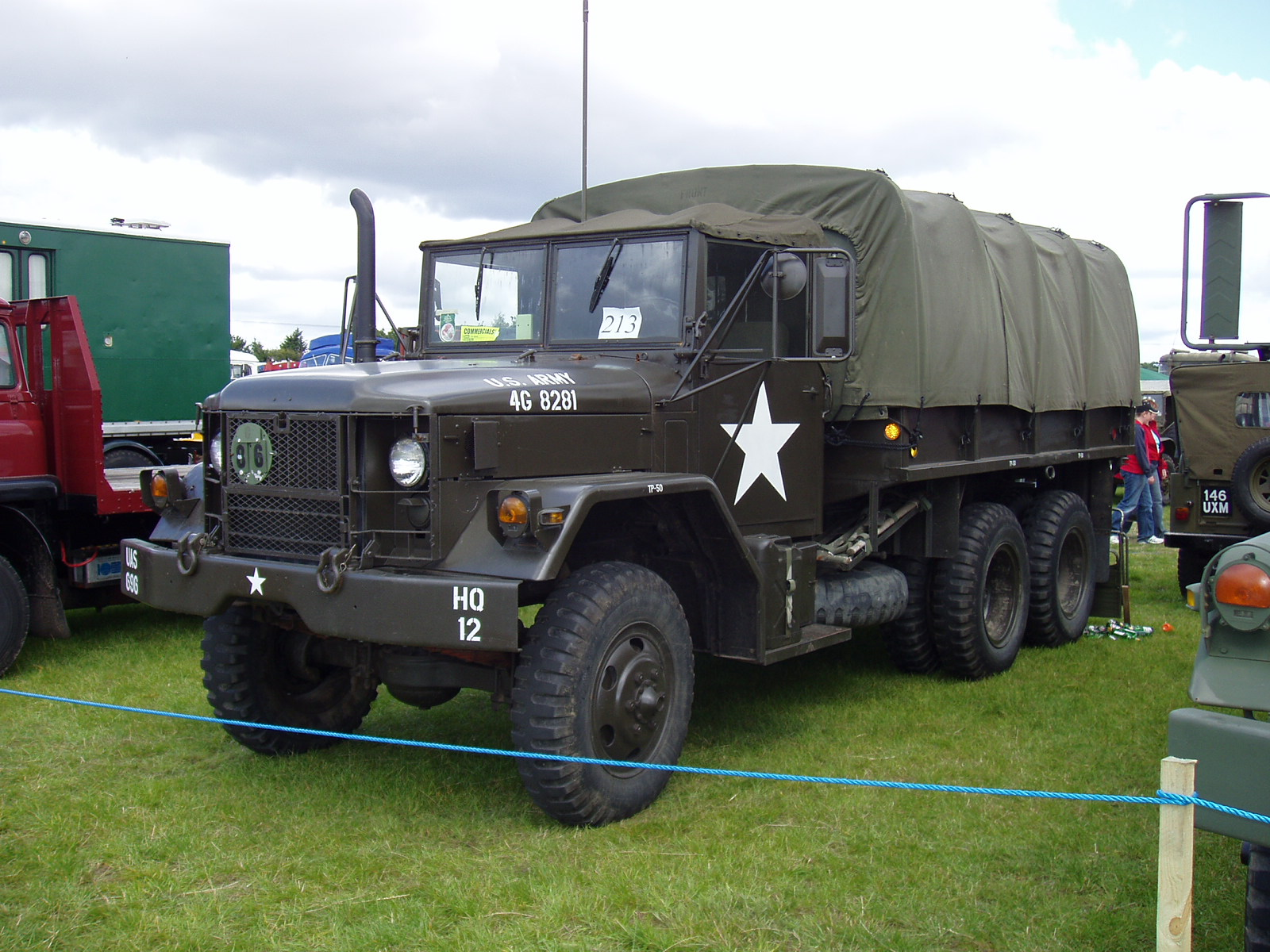
- An M35 2½-ton cargo truck
- Type: 2½-ton (2,268kg) 6×6 cargo truck
- Place of origin: United States

Service history
- In service: 1949–2000s (still in limited service by some National Guard units)

Production history
- Designer: REO
- Designed: 1944
- Manufacturer: REO, Kaiser, Studebaker, AM General, Kia and Ssangyong (South Korea only), Bombardier (Canada only)
- Produced: 1948–2006; 1948–1988 (M34, M35A1, M35A2); 1994–2006 (M35A3)
- Variants: M35A1, M35A2, M35A3

Specifications (with winch)
- Mass: 14,880 lb (6,750 kg) empty 17,880 lb (8,110 kg) loaded
- Length: 274 3/4 in (6.98 m)
- Width: 93 in (2.36 m)
- Height: 111 in (2.82 m) to cab
- Engine: REO OA-331; 127 hp (95 kW)
- Transmission: 5 spd. × 2 range trf. case
- Suspension: Beam axles on leaf springs
- Operational range: 500 mi (800 km)
- Maximum speed: 58 mph (93 km/h)

The M35 2½-ton cargo truck is a long-lived 2½-ton 6×6 cargo truck initially used by the United States Army and subsequently utilized by many nations around the world. Over time it evolved into a family of specialized vehicles. It inherited the nickname "Deuce and a Half" from an older 2½-ton truck, the World War II GMC CCKW.

The M35 started as a 1949 M34 REO Motor Car Company design for a 2½-ton 6×6 off-road truck. This original 6-wheel M34 version with a single wheel tandem was quickly superseded by the 10-wheel M35 design with a dual tandem. The basic M35 cargo truck is rated to carry 5,000 pounds (2,300 kg) off-road or 10,000 pounds (4,500 kg) on roads. Trucks in this weight class are considered medium duty by the military and the Department of Transportation.

== Specifications ==
=== Dimensions ===
An M35A2 cargo truck with a 10,000 pounds-force (44 kN) PTO-driven Garwood front winch is 112 inches (2.8 m) tall, 96 inches (2.4 m) wide and 277 inches (7.0 m) long, and 13,030 pounds (5,910 kg) empty (13,530 pounds (6,140 kg) empty when equipped with the front mount winch, according to dashboard dataplates). The standard wheelbase cargo bed is 8 feet wide by 12 feet long (2.4 × 3.6 m), with only 7.25 feet of this width being flat floorspace between the stake-pockets, the tailgate rising 16 inches above the floor and the side-walls/stake-pockets rising 12 inches above the floor. The M35A2 was available with a canvas soft top or a metal hard top. Metal hard-top configurations are most often found on vehicles that have been equipped with cold-weather gear, including additional insulation in the cab, as well as engine coolant or multifuel-fired cab personnel heaters.

The curb weight of an M35 is between 13,000 pounds (5,900 kg) and 16,000 pounds (7,300 kg) empty, depending on configuration (cargo, wrecker, tractor, etc.). Its top speed is 56 mph (90 km/h), though maximum cruising speed is approximately 48 mph (77 km/h). Fuel economy is 11 mpg_{‑US} (21 L/100 km; 13 mpg_{‑imp}) highway and 8 mpg_{‑US} (29 L/100 km; 9.6 mpg_{‑imp}) city, giving the vehicle a 400–500-mile (600–800 km) range on its 50 U.S. gallons (190 L; 42 imp gal) single fuel tank. Most operators experience an average of 10 mpg_{‑US} (24 L/100 km; 12 mpg_{‑imp}) for an unladen vehicle.

The 6-wheel M34 had a single-wheel tandem and used 11:00×20 size tires, which required a wheel well in the cargo bed, while the 10-wheel M35 had a dual-wheel tandem and used smaller 9:00×20 tires, which did not require a wheel well.

=== Drivetrain ===
The M35A2 is commonly powered by an LDT 465 engine, made by either Continental Motors Company, Hercules, or White Motor Company. It is an in-line, 478-cubic-inch (7.8 L), six-cylinder, turbocharged multifuel engine developing 134 bhp (100 kW) and 330 pound-feet (447 N⋅m) of torque. This is coupled with a 5-speed manual transmission and divorced 2-speed transfer case( note -hidden gear in low range, shift up to 4th in high range, shift transfer to low, trans to 5th then transfer to high 5th again).(either a sprag-operated transfer case Rockwell 136-21 or air-operated selectable transfer case Rockwell 136–27). Multifuel engines are designed to operate reliably on a wide variety of fuels, including diesel fuel, kerosene, heating oil or gasoline. Gasoline may be used only in an emergency because it does not properly lubricate the injector pump. While using gasoline, common practice calls for the addition of at least 1 U.S. quart of clean motor oil per 15 U.S. gallons of gasoline (1 imp qt/13 imp gal; 1 L/60 L) for proper pump lubrication where available.

Although the A2 version is the most common, there are four different iterations: Standard, A1, A2, and A3. These changes mainly had to do with the engine and transmission components. Standard M35 had a REO "Gold Comet" or Continental OA331 inline-6 gasoline engine. Some had 4-speed transmissions but most had "direct 5th" transmissions. The gasoline-powered deuces were built primarily by REO Motors, however, Studebaker also had a manufacturing contract from at least 1951 into the early 1960s. Curtis-Wright also had a contract in at least 1958 to build dump trucks with the Continental gas engine. The A1's had Continental LDS-427-2 turbo engines, equipped with either a model 4-450 Schwitzer turbo or a 4D454C Schwitzer turbo on later models, and 5th gear was an overdrive. The 140 hp engines were not reliable, suffering frequent headgasket failures.

The first A2 trucks received the bigger LD-465-1 naturally aspirated 478 CID multifuel engines, keeping the OD transmission of the A1s. Through the years the trucks were upgraded to LD 465-1c engines, with 60Amp alternator instead of the 25Amp generator. With the addition of a turbocharger, the engine evolved into the LDT 465-1c (turbo clean air). The turbo was added more to clean up the black exhaust on the Non Turbo engines, than to add power; the HP was raised from 130 to only 135 HP. Turbo models used: 3LD305 (early engines only) and 3LJ319 (the "whistler") The LDT-465-1D was the last version of the Multi Fuel, it had the same 3LJ319 Turbo (whistler), or the quieter 3LM39 (non-whistler), better head gasket sealing and head cooling.

==== M35A3 ====
From 1994 until 2006, the M35A3 variant was introduced as part of Extended Service Program. Usually, A3 vehicles have a Caterpillar 3116 Diesel engine and had their manual transmissions replaced with Allison 1545 4-speed automatic transmissions, as well as receiving numerous other improvements with a redesigned frontal appearance. No new A3 manual transmission vehicles were produced, all vehicles being upgraded from previous configurations during the rebuild process. The exception is some M109A3 shop vans. A small number of M109A3s were upgraded to A4 specifications using the M35A3 upgrade parts and procedures. As-built original Pre A2s are gasoline-powered, A1s use the LDS 427-2 multifuel engine, A2s use the LD/LDT 465-1c multifuel engine, and A3s use the Caterpillar diesel. It is common, however, to find rebuilds of former gas-powered REO and Studebaker models having A1 and A2 multifuel configurations. The original contract for the M35 - Service Life Extension Program was competitive. The last two companies to send vehicles to Aberdeen Proving Ground were AM General, South Bend, IN and Cummins Military Systems, Augusta, GA (AMG was awarded third quarter of 1993).

=== Brakes ===
The brake system is air-assisted-hydraulic six-wheel drum brakes with a driveline parking brake, although gladhands exist on the rear of the vehicle for connection to trailers with full air service and emergency brakes. Braking performance of the truck is similar to other power drum brake vehicles of this size. Each drum was designed with maximum efficiency in mind, and individual drums can dissipate up to 12 kilowatts (16 hp) of braking heat. Due to this brake system and GVWR under 26,001 pounds (11,794 kg), the M35 can be driven without a commercial driver's license in most states.

=== Electrical ===
The electrical system is 24 volt, using two 12 volt 6TL-series military grade batteries run in series.

== Operational history ==
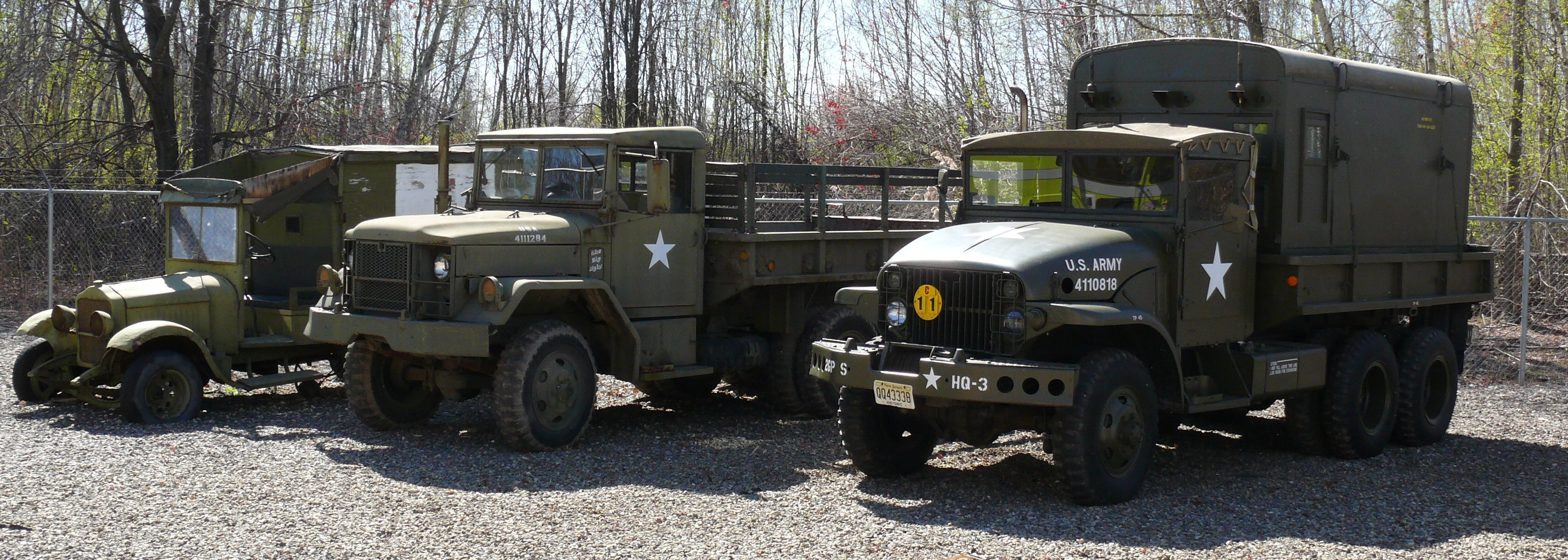
M211 is to the right of M35

The M series truck family was introduced in 1949 to replace the GMC CCKW and M135 family cargo trucks that constituted the backbone of U.S. military transport since their introduction in World War II. The M35 would not completely replace the M135 family until the middle of the 1960s. However, the M35 would quickly become the dominant truck in its class in the U.S. military, serving with all the services in various capacities. For a short period the M34 was called "The Eager Beaver" by the U.S. Army due to its fording ability. But the name was never popular and forgotten in a few years.

The M35 series was to be replaced by the Light Medium Tactical Vehicle. However, many United States National Guard and Reserve units continued to use them as the new family of vehicles was phased in. The M35 series was used by the United States in Iraq during Operation Iraqi Freedom. M35 series vehicles were known to be in use by National Guard units as late as the mid-2000s.

In order to replace its 1950s vintage M135 fleet, the Canadian Army adopted licensed versions of the M35 (and M36 variant) built in Canada by Bombardier in 1982. As of 2020, the trucks, designated MLVW (Medium Logistics Vehicle, Wheeled) were still in service although limited spare part supplies forced the fleet managers to cannibalize from selected donors. Canadian vehicles feature a hard cab roof, an adjustable driver's seat, an Allison MT-643 automatic transmission, a Detroit Diesel engine displacing 500 cubic inches (8.2 L), six wheels instead of ten (using single wheels on the tandem rear axles instead of dual wheels), and an ether-start for winter operations. The original 11.00X20 bias ply tires on split ring wheels were later changed fleet-wide to Michelin radials on bolt-together wheels in 2002 due to safety concerns. Canada had been investigating a replacement under the Medium Support Vehicle System Project, and a vehicle has been selected. The MLVWs were initially not deployed with Canadian Forces in Afghanistan because of their lack of armor protection. An armor kit was subsequently developed leading to a limited deployment of the vehicles.

== Variants ==
The M34/M35 series of trucks came in wide array of variants and subvariants. As noted engine differences could be noted by the A1, A2, or A3 suffix, but additional suffix letters were also sometimes added. These letters had different meanings depending on what variant to which they were applied.

Under the nomenclature system used by the United States Army Ordnance Corps Supply Catalog (known as G-series) the M34/M35/M36 family is designated G742.

=== Cargo ===
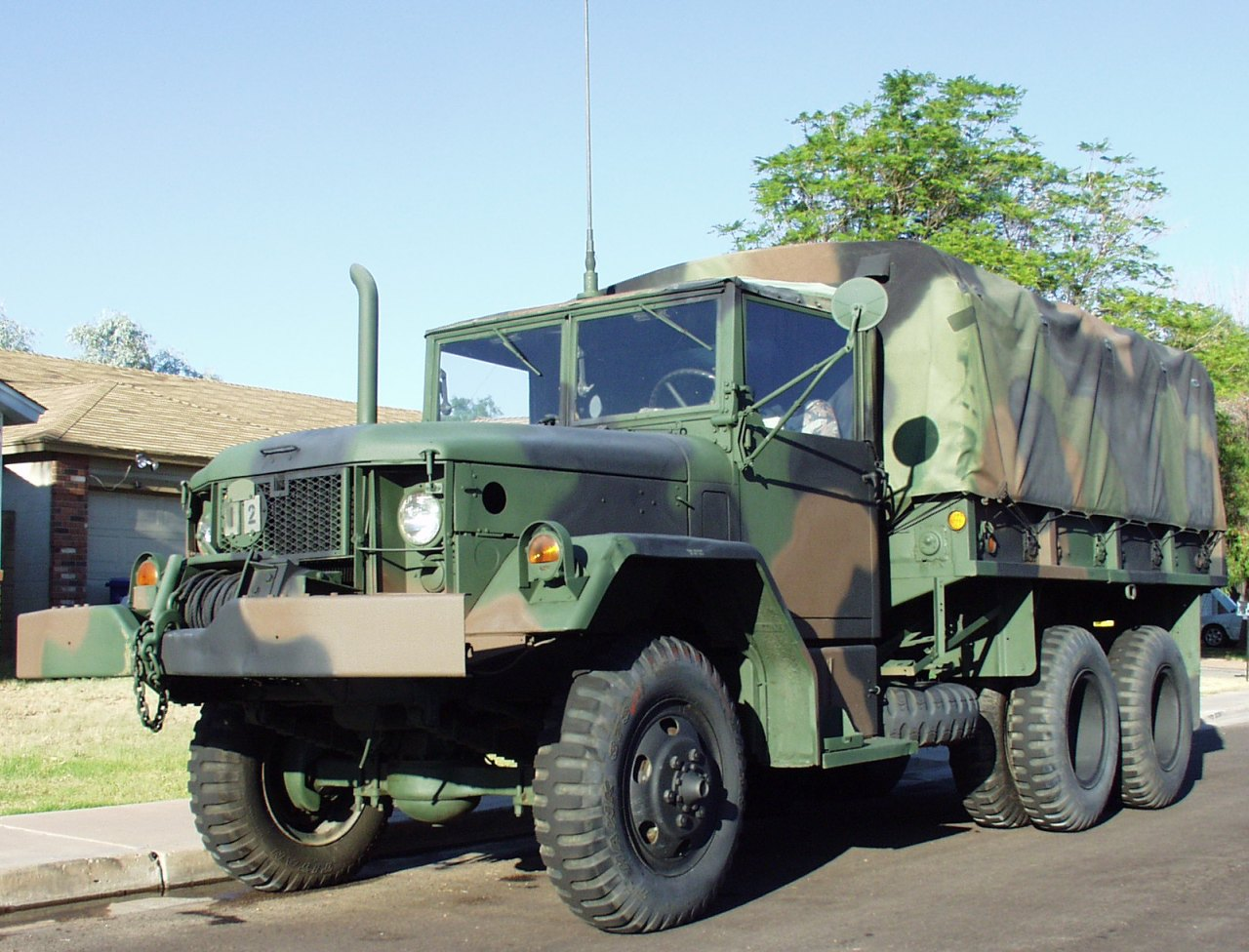
AM General M35A2 with winch and camouflage cargo cover

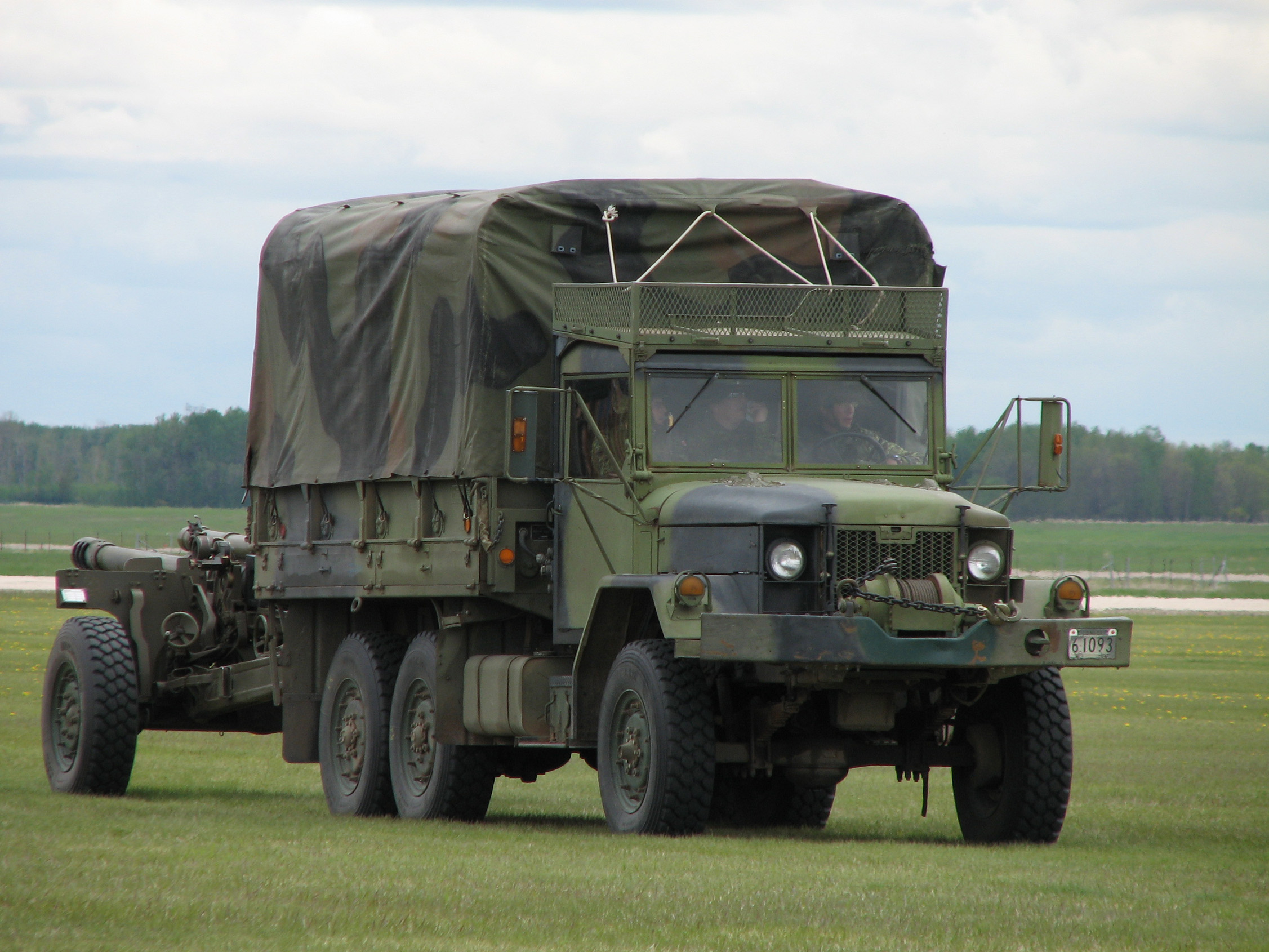
Bombardier MLVW licensed version of M35, with C3 howitzer in tow

As noted the original basic gasoline-powered truck variants were first the M34, and then the M35. An extra long wheel-base variant, designated the M36, was also developed (featuring a 16-foot (4.9 m) cargo bed). Variants with a C suffix (such as M35A2C or M36A2C) featured a straight drop-side cargo bed. M44, M45, and M46 simply designated the long single tandem, long double tandem, and extra long double tandem chassis for the M35 2 1/2-ton series of trucks; there was also a short tandem chassis without an M designation. These cab/chassis would serve as the basis for many more specialized variants.

In 1982, Bombardier produced a M35 variant for the Canadian Forces' medium logistic vehicle, wheeled platform. This featured an Allison MT-643 automatic transmission, and a Detroit Diesel engine displacing 500 cubic inches (8.2 L). The original 11.00X20 bias ply tires on split ring wheels were later changed fleet-wide to Michelin radials on bolt-together wheels in 2002 due to safety concerns.

=== Tank truck ===
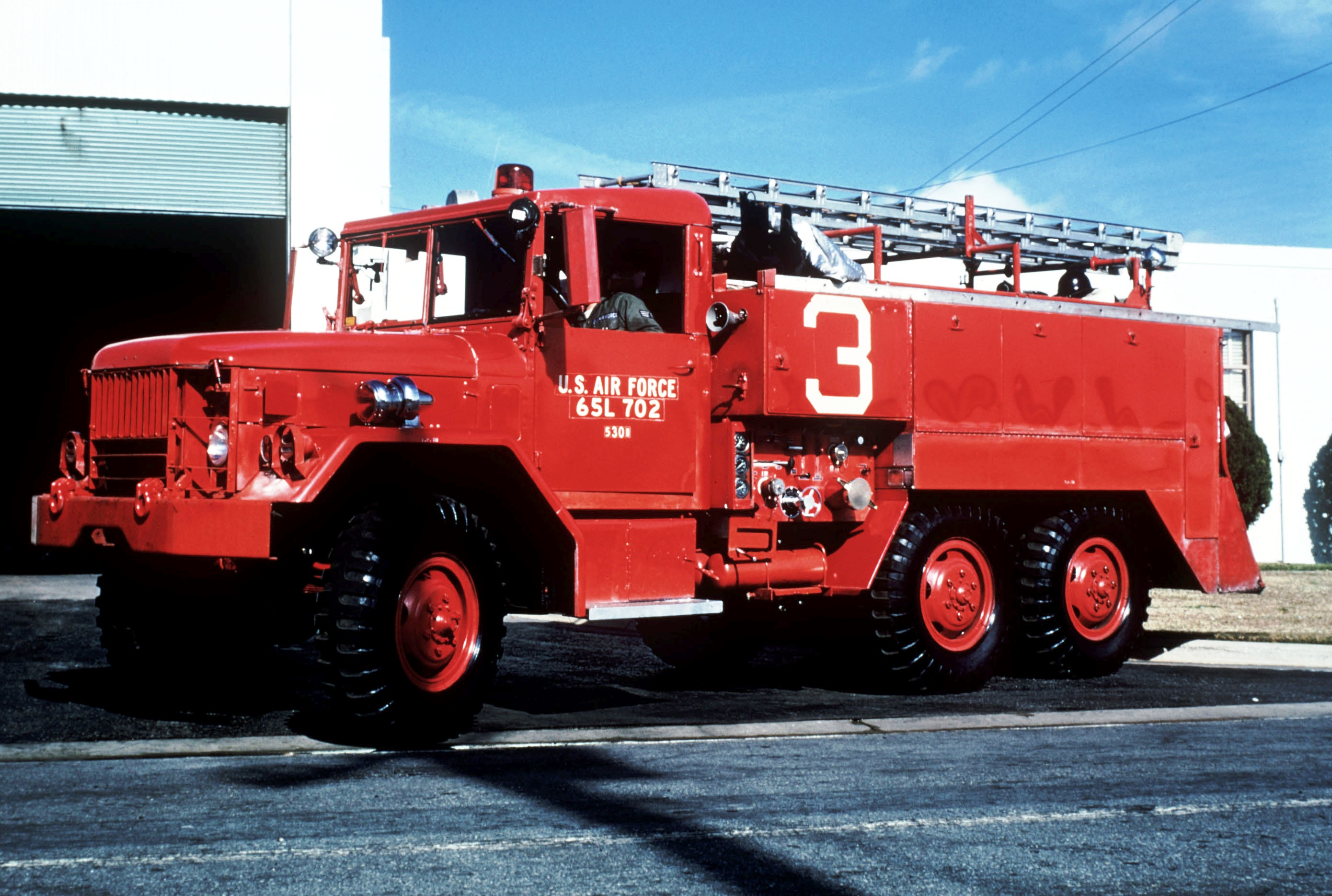
A USAF air base structural fire fighting engine/pumper 530B based on M35. The door mounted serial number indicates this unit was contracted for in Fiscal Year 1965 and its type code is "L" which means a military vehicle (as opposed to a commercial or "off the shelf" design,), Special Purpose...in this case a fire truck.

The M49 fuel tanker and M50 water tanker variants were initially based on the M45 chassis. The M49C series, however, were vehicles converted from C series drop-side cargo variants. M49s have 1,200-gallon tanks. Early models had triple compartments (200g front, 400g mid, baffled 600g rear), but most models have two 600-gallon baffled tanks. The M50 had a 1,000-U.S.-gallon (3,800 L; 830 imp gal) water tank, of which later variants had internal baffles to combat weight transfer during motion. In some areas the M35 is still used today as a wildland firefighting truck with a portable water supply and fully operational pump.

=== Van ===
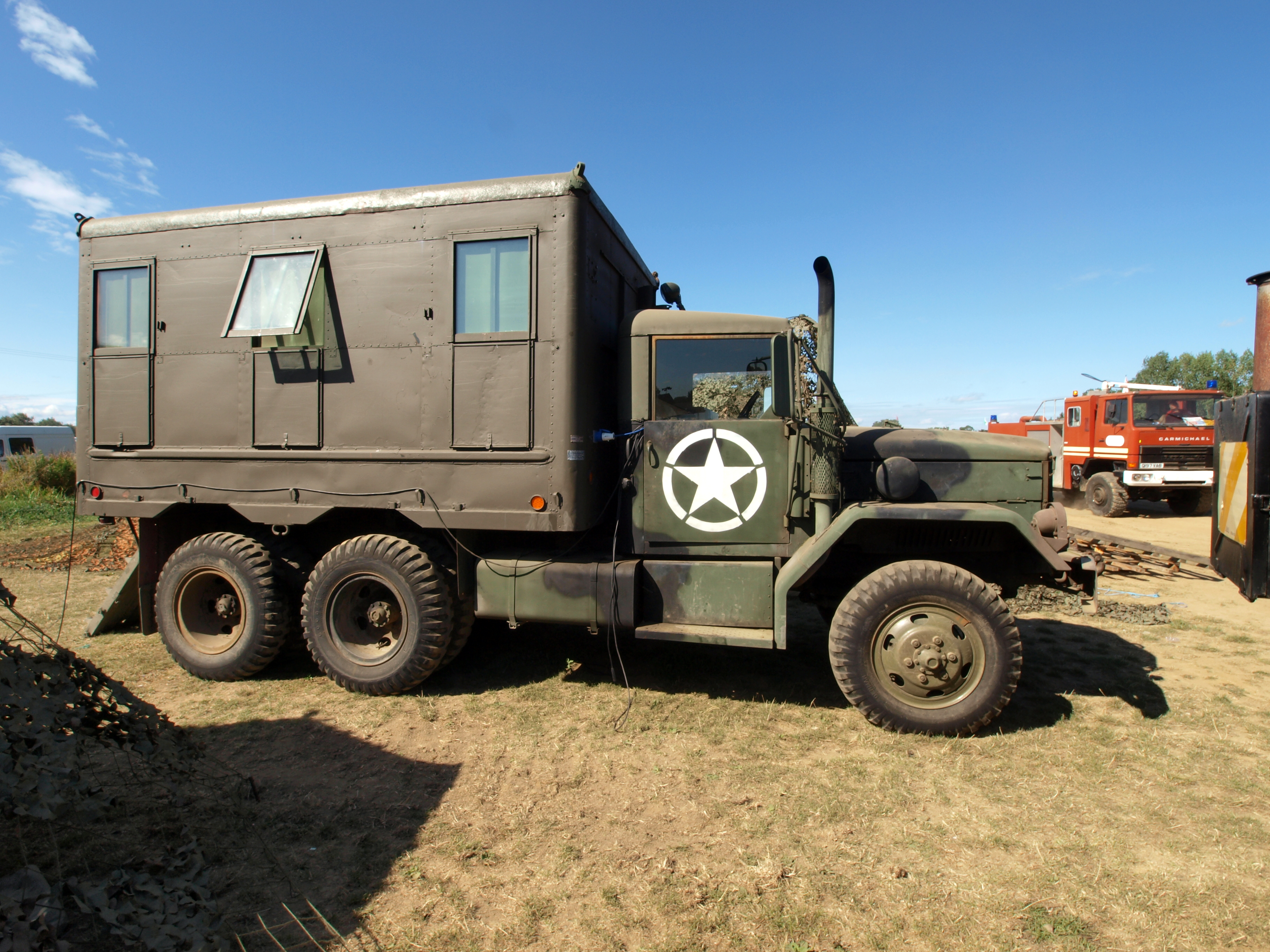
An M109A3 Shop Van

A number of variants with van bodies, primarily for use as maintenance shop vans, were also created. The basic model was the M109, with a variant that could mount the PTO winch was designated M185. The M185 was a machine shop version of the M109 that carried a light duty crane, tools, other items. It often towed a M105 trailer. An expandable van variant with hydraulic lift gate was designated M292. Another expandable van variant carried a water purification unit for supplying potable water. The M46 chassis could be used for mounting the expandable "Bat-Wing" machine shop body, but because of the weight of the machinery the preferred mount was by far the M809 5-ton chassis. Two variants of the M109 van were specifically developed as service vehicles for the MGM-18 Lacrosse missile system, the XM411 for the Ground Guidance Electronic Equipment, and the XM412 with special tools and test equipment for the electronic guidance and control system. A medical van variant was designated M132.

=== Wrecker and tractor ===
A wrecker based on the M45 chassis was designated as the M60, while the similar M108 crane truck was used for many tasks, but primarily to handle guided missiles such as the Lacrosse. Two tractor variants for towing semi-trailers were developed, the M48 and M275. The M48 featured a full-length M45 chassis (178 inch wheelbase, identical to the M35 cargo), while the M275 featured a shortened M45 chassis (166 in wheelbase) for reduced weight and greater maneuverability. However, due to the smaller size and lower power of the 2 1/2-ton trucks, most heavier loads were handled by their respective 5-ton counterparts. As a result, few were produced.

=== Construction ===
A number of specialized construction variants were developed. The M47 and M59 dump trucks were developed, based on a shortened 166 inch wheelbase M44 and M45 chassis respectively. An improved dump truck based on the full length 178 inch wheelbase M45 chassis, designated the M342, was designed to replace both the M47 and the M59, as well as the M135-based M215.

Also under the M45 chassis was the signal corps V-17 pole derrick, and the V-18 auger truck, later replaced by the M35 upgrade below.

The M756 was a specialized pipeline repair vehicle, the M763 was designed for telephone line repair, and the M764 was a specialized earth-boring and pole-setting variant. The M45 chassis was also used to mount an air compressor.

=== Gun trucks ===
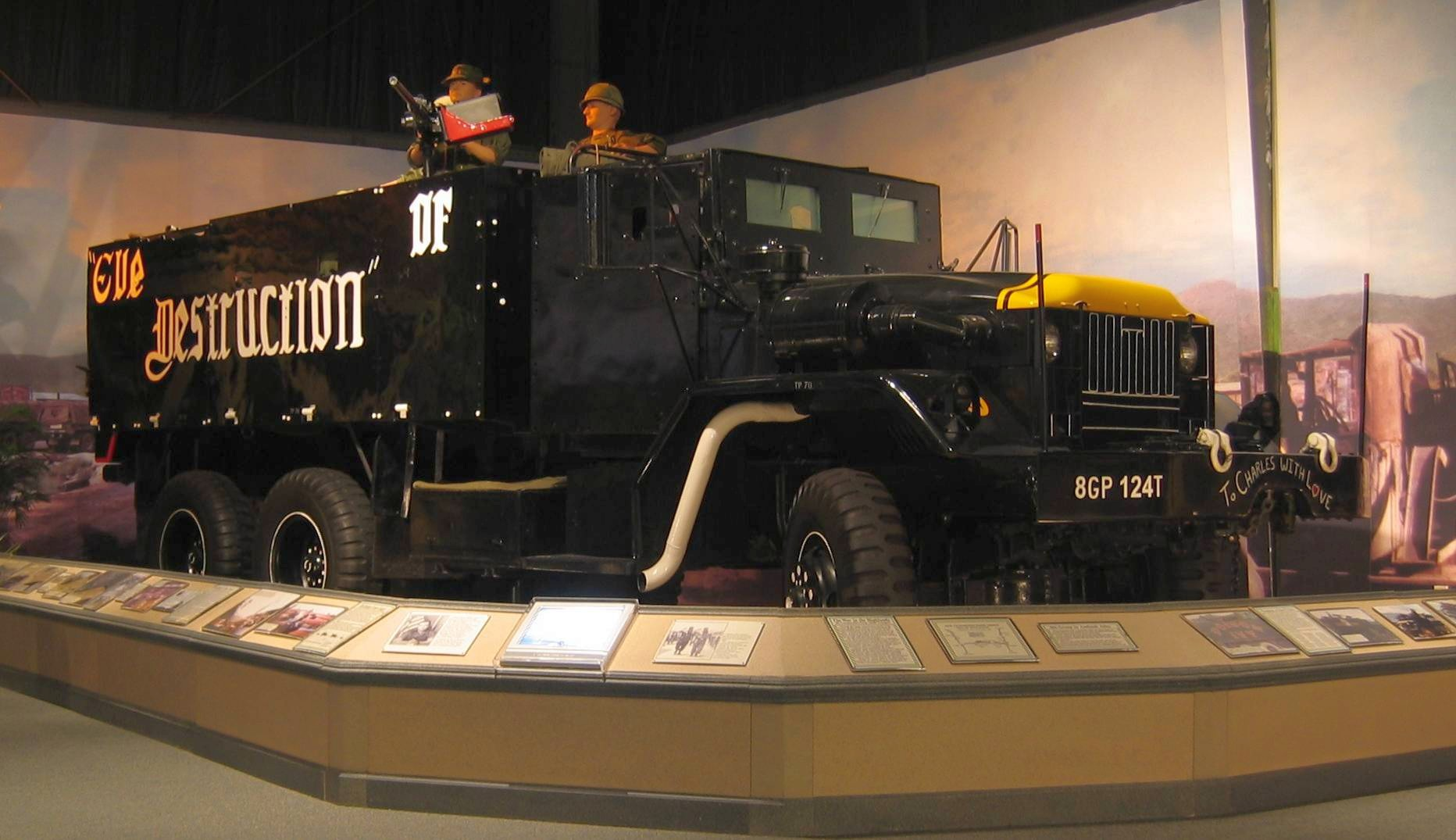
Eve of Destruction, a 5-ton M54-based gun truck at Fort Eustis

The versatility of the pattern was perhaps shown best in its usage as an armored "gun truck" for patrol duties and convoy escort.

The simplest examples were produced by simply placing an existing light gun mount directly onto the cargo bed of the truck, and securing it in place. No armouring or special support equipment was installed. One such conversion was performed in Congo-Leopoldville in 1965, using an Oerlikon GAI 20 mm anti-aircraft gun. Another conversion in the Congo entailed mounting pods with 2.75" aircraft rockets on a pedestal on the cargo bed, but this proved unsuccessful.

The first more sophisticated conversions of the pattern were performed by the U.S. military in Vietnam. U.S. Army Artillery Battalions (Automatic Weapons, Self-Propelled) were often assigned Artillery Batteries (.50-caliber), units equipped with M35 trucks and M55 Quadmount systems mounting four M2 Browning machine guns. Units were also authorized a single M60 machine gun and M79 grenade launcher. While the M35 was designed to act as the prime mover for the M55 Quadmount system, which included a towed trailer, the M45 mount was often removed or the wheels removed from the trailer, and the system mounted on the bed of the truck. The M55 system was also mounted on the M54 truck.

More simplified armoring projects were conducted as well, adding armored walls of various thicknesses to standard cargo variants. A smaller bed-mounted multi-angle "box" was also tried. U.S. Army gun trucks used a wide variety of weapons including the M2 Browning machine gun, M60 machine gun, and even the M134 Minigun.

At the end of the Vietnam War most of these vehicles were returned to their standard configuration, except for a single original example shipped to the U.S. Army Transportation Museum at Fort Eustis, Virginia in 1971.

Numerous Vietnam veterans have expended countless hours to build full size replicas of their original Gun Trucks, using M35, M54, and even Army Dump Trucks as platforms, much the same as these veterans did in Vietnam. A functional display replica of the "Psychotic Reaction" Gun Truck Based on an M35A2 chassis is currently in use and being displayed at many military vehicle displays and Vietnam veteran reunions / events.

The concept lived on well after the Vietnam War. El Salvador converted a number of M35 type vehicles into armored trucks in the 1980s, after successful conversions of Magirus Deutz trucks. These vehicles were nicknamed "Mazingers" in reference to the Japanese cartoon Mazinger Z.

The Philippine Marine Corps also began converting M35 type trucks to an armored configuration by 2004. The first vehicle, dubbed "Talisman," utilized armor fabricated from derelict LVTP5 amphibious personnel carriers. Later gun trucks were built using more standard components and bear some resemblance to U.S. military vehicles of the Vietnam era. The Philippine Marine Corps had also begun the creation of an anti-aircraft element by 2006, utilizing M35 based vehicles. Two types of vehicles have been seen so far. One utilizes the Mk 56 Mod 0 mount from the Patrol Boat, River, with two M2 Browning machine guns, while the other features another former naval mount with a single Oerlikon 20 mm cannon.

Colombia maintains a fleet of REO M35 "Meteoro" armored trucks. These locally fabricated armored vehicles are used to guard tourist bus caravans as well as mobile checkpoints. Early vehicles were not fabricated to any particular standard and typically hosted three weapon stations that could be fitted with a 7.62 mm (.308-cal) or .50-caliber (12.7 mm) machine gun. The weapon stations may or may not have had a gun shield on any particular vehicle. More recent examples follow a pattern with the cab and fuel tanks armored and the drop side cargo bed converted to an armored box, atop which is a "gun tower," a set of four heavily armored weapon stations, one facing each direction. .50-caliber machine guns are mounted front and back, with 7.62 mm machine guns mounted to the sides. Losses in the Meteoro fleet instigated the purchase of the BTR-80 Caribe.

In addition to the basic cargo version, tank water and fuel models were used. The CEMABLIN-(Centro de Mantenimiento de Blindados del Ejército Venezolano) locally manufactured a version of anti-air defense operations and support, thanks to all the necessary parts were stored and in perfect condition. 6 units were produced in early 1998. The "Fénix" system was assigned to the 1103º BDAA 40mm. based at Fort Yaurepara in Zulia state. But they had problems with the tower's weight and shoot on the move. They were retired in 1998 and substituted by the AMX-13 M55/M4E1 "Ráfaga" 40mm also produced locally stored material advantage and in good condition. The "Fénix" is a M4E1 tower, recovered from a car M42 Duster and 2 M50 machine guns .30 caliber for Protective Part (a cylindrical tower made of welded armor plate with open top with twin mounting Bofors 40 mm gun), mounted on a tactical platform Truck 6x6 2 1/2-ton Reo M-35.

=== Civilian conversions ===
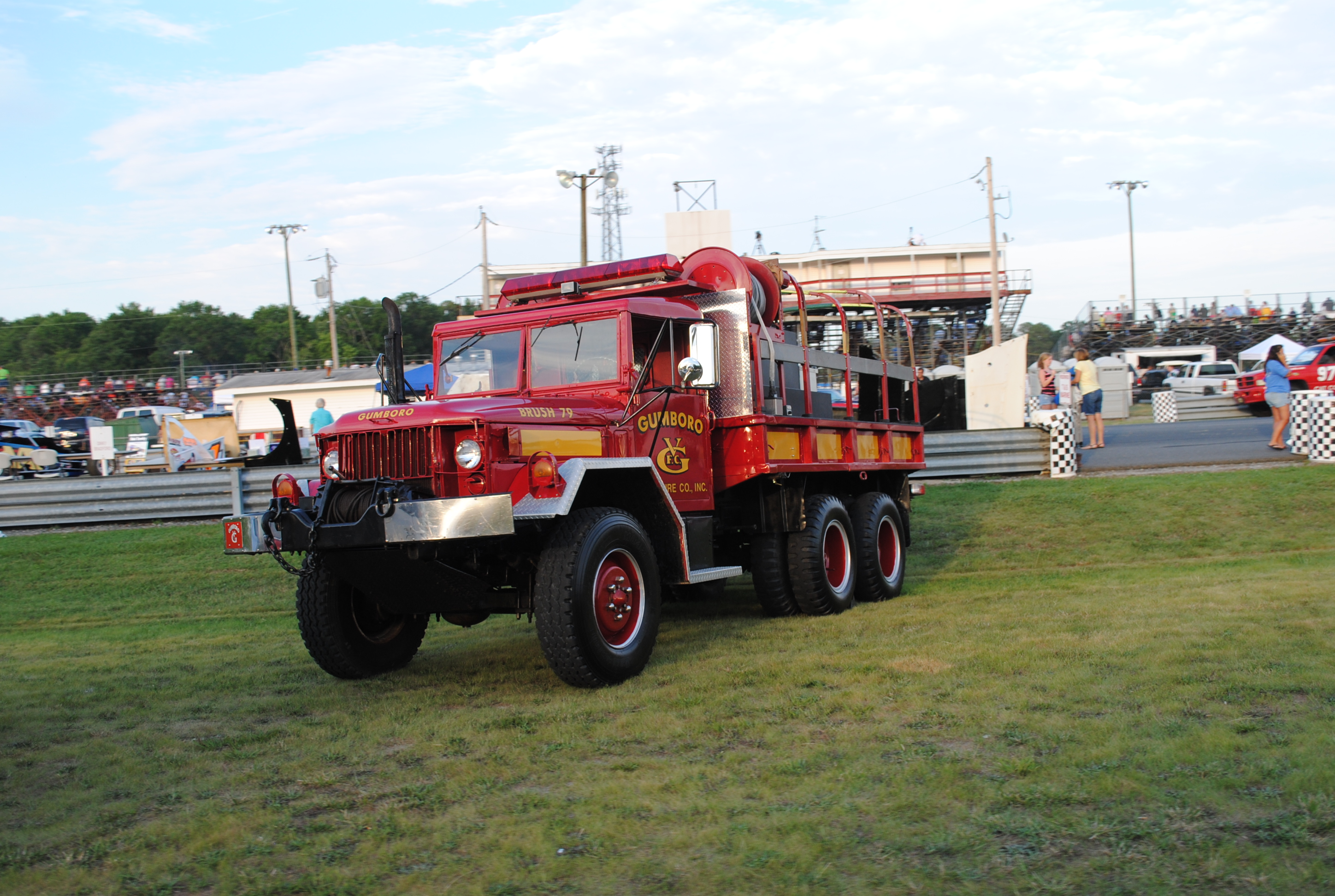
Gumboro Volunteer Fire Company M35 cargo truck heavy brush truck.

The M35-series trucks have been sold as surplus both to military vehicle collectors and to persons or organizations looking for an inexpensive truck capable of off-road operation. Users have included farmers, rural electric utilities, and fire departments. Surplus vehicles may be retained in military configuration, or modified to suit the needs of their new owners. Such modifications may include "bobbed" chassis with one of the rear axles removed, new cargo beds or boxes, fuel or water tanks, and conversion of the electrical system to 12 volts. One famous example is the "War Wagon", a bobbed M35A2 outfitted with a stepside pickup truck bed and painted in the colors of Auburn University. Its owner and builder, Terrell Glove can be seen driving the streets of Auburn, Alabama near Toomer's corner on football game days.

=== Localized versions ===
The M35 is otherwise known as the M6 or the M621 in the Norwegian Military, the main difference is that the truck as standard has airlockers on all 3 axles as opposed to none on the regular M35. Furthermore, the rear of the truck is normally singled out so that it sports 6 wheels instead of the normal 10.

=== Weight ===
Model	Length	Width	Height	Weight empty
M34 Cargo; LWB, single tandem	21 ft 9 in (6.63 m) (Note: Without winch, with winch add 14 in (35.5 cm).)	8 ft 2 in (2.48 m)	8 ft 8 in (2.64 m) (Note: To tarpaulin bows)	11,775 lb (5,352 kg) (Note: Without winch, with winch add approx. 400 lb (186 kg).)
M35A3C Cargo; Dropside, LWB	22 ft (6.71 m)	8 ft 2 in (2.48 m)	9 ft 4 in (2.85 m)	14,740 lb (6,692 kg)
M36A3 Cargo; XLWB	27 ft 5 in (8.36 m)	8 ft (2.44 m)	10 ft 3 in (3.15 m)	15,280 lb (6,937 kg)
M44 Chassis, LWB; 178 in wheelbase, single tandem	22 ft (6.71 m)	8 ft 2 in (2.48 m)	8 ft 1 in (2.46 m) (Note: To top of cab roof.)	
M45 Chassis, LWB; 178 in wheelbase, dual tandem	22 ft (6.71 m)	8 ft 2 in (2.48 m)	8 ft 1 in (2.46 m)	
M46 Chassis, XLWB; 214 in wheelbase	27 ft 5 in (8.36 m)	8 ft 2 in (2.48 m)	8 ft 1 in (2.46 m)	
M47 Dump; SWB, single tandem	19 ft 7 in (5.96 m)	8 ft (2.43 m)	8 ft 8 in (2.64 m)	13,190 lb (5,995 kg)
M48 Semi-tractor; LWB	20 ft 1 in (6.13 m) (Note: Without winch, with winch add 12 in (31 cm).)	8 ft (2.43 m)	8 ft 1 in (2.46 m)	11,841 lb (5,371 kg)
M49A2C Tank; Fuel service, LWB	21 ft 11 in (6.68 m)	8 ft (2.44 m)	8 ft 6 in (2.58 m)	14,340 lb (6,510 kg) (Note: Without winch, with winch add 520 lb (2336 kg).)
M50A3 Tank; Water, LWB	21 ft 11 in (6.68 m)	8 ft (2.44 m)	8 ft 6 in (2.58 m)	14,360 lb (6,642 kg)
M59 Dump; SWB	19 ft 10 in (6.02 m)	8 ft (2.44 m)	8 ft 10 in (2.68 m)	14,060 lb (6,378 kg)
M60 Wrecker; LWB	25 ft 3 in (7.70 m) (Note: All fitted with winch.) (Note: To end of boom in lowered and retracted position)	8 ft (2.44 m)	8 ft 10 in (2.68 m)	23,960 lb (10,869 kg)
M108 Crane; LWB	25 ft 5 in (7.70 m)	8 ft (2.44 m)	8 ft 10 in (2.68 m)	19,785 lb (8,974 kg)
M109A3 Van; Repair shop, LWB	22 ft 4 in (6.81 m)	8 ft (2.44 m)	10 ft 11 in (3.32 m)	15,280 lb (6,937 kg)
M275A2 Semi-tractor, SWB	19 ft (5.79 m)	7 ft 10 in (2.37 m)	8 ft 6 in (2.58 m)	12,125 lb (5,504 kg)
M292A5 Van; Expansible, XLWB	28 ft 9 in (8.78 m)	7 ft 10in (2.39 m)	11 ft 1 in (3.37 m)	20,020 lb (9,081 kg)
M342A2 Dump; LWB	21 ft 8 in (6.60 m)	8 ft (2.44 m)	8 ft 9 in (2.67 m)	15,255 lb (6,925 kg)
M387 Launcher Guided missile (Note: MGM-18 Lacrosse SRBM), LWB, single tandem	21 ft 11 in (6.68 m)	7 ft 10 in (2.39 m)	9 ft 8 in (2.95 m)	
M398 Launcher; Guided missile (Note: MGM-18 Lacrosse SRBM), LWB	21 ft 11 in (6.68 m)	7 ft 10 in (2.39 m)	9 ft 8 in (2.95 m)	
M756A2 Maintenance; Pipeline construction, LWB	23 ft 11 in (7.26 m)	8 ft (2.44 m)	9 ft 5 in (2.87 m)	20,600 lb (9,352 kg)
M764 Earth boring and pole-setting, LWB	25 ft 5 in (7.45 m)	8 ft (2.44 m)	9 ft 2 in (2.77 m)	20,600 lb (9,352 kg)
Class 530B; Fire truck, LWB	22 ft 8 in (6.91 m)	8 ft (2.44 m)	9 ft 2 in (2.79 m)	

== Operators ==
- Argentina
- Austria
- Bolivia
- Brazil
- Cambodia
- Canada (Canadian Army replaced them with the MSVS)
- Chad
- Chile (Used by the Chilean Army and the Chilean Marine Corps)
- Colombia
- Democratic Republic of Congo
- Denmark
- Djibouti
- Dominican Republic
- Ecuador
- Egypt
- El Salvador
- Fiji
- Georgia
- Germany
- Greece
- Guatemala
- Honduras
- Indonesia
- Iran
- Israel
- Jordan
- Laos
- Lebanon
- Liberia
- Mexico
- Morocco
- Nicaragua
- Norway
- Moldova
- Pakistan
- Panama
- Philippines
- Portugal
- South Korea called K-511, K-511A1
- Saudi Arabia
- Sudan
- Sweden (evaluation only)
- Taiwan(gradually replace with International 7400 4x4 trucks)
- Thailand
- Tunisia
- Turkey
- United States (replaced by LMTV)
- Venezuela
- Vietnam

== See also ==
- M809 series trucks
- List of U.S. military vehicles by model number
- Studebaker US6, a US "deuce-and-a-half" truck of World War II
- M939 Truck
- Family of Medium Tactical Vehicles – replacement for M35 and M939
- List of U.S. military vehicles by supply catalog designation (G-numbers)
- List of U.S. Signal Corps Vehicles (V-numbers)
- GMC CCKW, another US "deuce-and-a-half" military truck of WW II (and later)
- AEC Matador/CMP FAT/Canadian Military Pattern truck – predecessors to M35 and used by Canada during World War II
