= Manuel Antonio Matta =

Chilean politician (1826–1892)

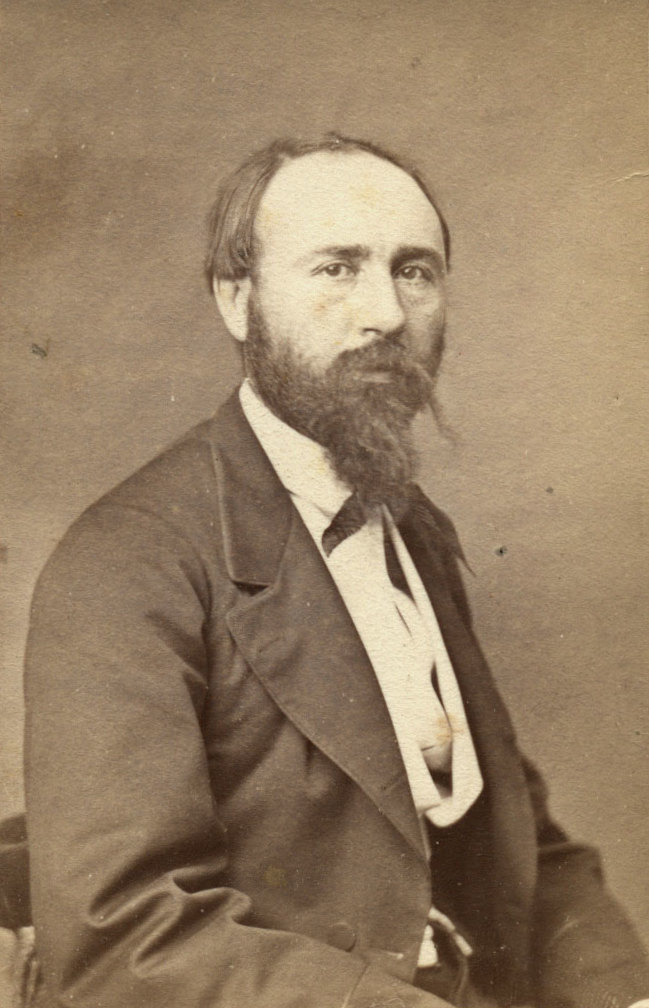
Manuel Antonio Matta, c. 1880

Manuel Antonio Matta Goyenechea (Copiapó, February 27, 1826 – Santiago, June 12, 1892) was a Chilean politician, lawyer and writer and co-founder of the Radical Party of Chile along with Pedro Leon Gallo.

== Biography ==
Born on February 27, 1826, in Copiapó, the son of the Chilote mining entrepreneur and public figure, Eugenio de Matta Vargas, and Petronila María Mercedes Goyenechea de la Sierra. His siblings were: Pedro Nolasco, Francisco de Paula, Felipe Santiago, Guillermo and María Mercedes Matta Goyenechea.

Although he was born in the northern city of Copiapó, he lived most of his life in the capital Santiago, where he was educated. He entered the school of Mrs. Josefa Cabezón de Villarino, the Seminario Conciliar and later the Instituto Nacional General José Miguel Carrera. He was also a student of Andrés Bello, from whom he received private lessons.

In 1841, when he was about to finish his law studies at the University of Chile, his father, Eugenio de Matta Vargas, decided that Manuel Antonio should travel to Europe, where he went when he was only eighteen years old. In the Old Continent he studied literature and philosophy. During his stays in Germany, France and England he met important political intellectuals such as Francisco Bilbao and Santiago Arcos, who influenced his radical thoughts.

He returned to Chile in 1848. That year he exercised his literary talents writing the Revista Santiago, El Picaflor and La Revista. The latter was discontinued in 1851 but returned to issue in 1855.

He founded the Fire Brigade of Santiago (on December 20, 1863) and was the first director of the Company of Guardians of Property (now the 6th Company of Fire Brigades of Santiago).

He died single and without descendants.

== Political life ==
Matta’s political career began in 1855 when he was elected deputy for his native Copiapó, and later re-elected in 1858. A year before his second election, Matta resigned from the Liberal Party of Chile, to found the new Radical Party. Of a group of young people of the same ideals, he was the leader along with his younger brother Guillermo Matta, Ángel Custodio Gallo, Pedro León Gallo, Francisco Marín and Juan Arteaga Alemparte. All of them formed the Constituent Assembly influenced by the French Revolution. Manuel Antonio was a Freemason since he was forty years old and his dream was a secular government.

It was not until José Joaquín Pérez took office that the radicals managed to formalize the party. Matta founded the newspaper La Voz de Chile in 1862 and led this group with radical ideas awaiting the arrival of Pedro León Gallo in 1863. The first assembly of the radicals originated that year.

In 1864 he was elected deputy for Copiapó and Caldera where he was reelected for four consecutive terms. Later he was elected president of the Chamber of Deputies, and then senator for Atacama, a position in which he was also reelected. His good run with the government would end in 1880 when in the first Radical convention presided by him, the government of Aníbal Pinto was strongly criticized and catalogued as corrupt. However, he was again supported by the government of Domingo Santa María.

Matta strongly opposed the government of José Manuel Balmaceda, even supporting his resignation. After the fall of Balmaceda, Matta took refuge in Buenos Aires and upon his return he was offered the Ministry of Foreign Affairs, Worship and Colonization of Chile, a position he assumed and was partly responsible for the Baltimore Case.

He was later elected senator for Tarapacá, a position he held at the time of his death, which took place in Santiago.

== Legacy ==
His party would reach the highest office in the country in 1931 with Juan Esteban Montero, and the radical governments formed by Pedro Aguirre Cerda, Juan Antonio Ríos and Gabriel González Videla would also originate from.

In honor of his outstanding political work, one of the most important streets in Copiapó was named after him, Avenida Manuel Antonio Matta, popularly known as Alameda Manuel Antonio Matta . Also in Santiago, for similar reasons, the famous Avenida Manuel Antonio Matta was built, known simply as Avenida Matta. Numerous streets in Chilean cities bear his name, referring to his legacy, as well as to the legacy of his no less prominent brother Guillermo Matta Goyenechea.
