= José Victorino Lastarria =

Chilean writer, legislative deputy, senator, diplomat and finance minister

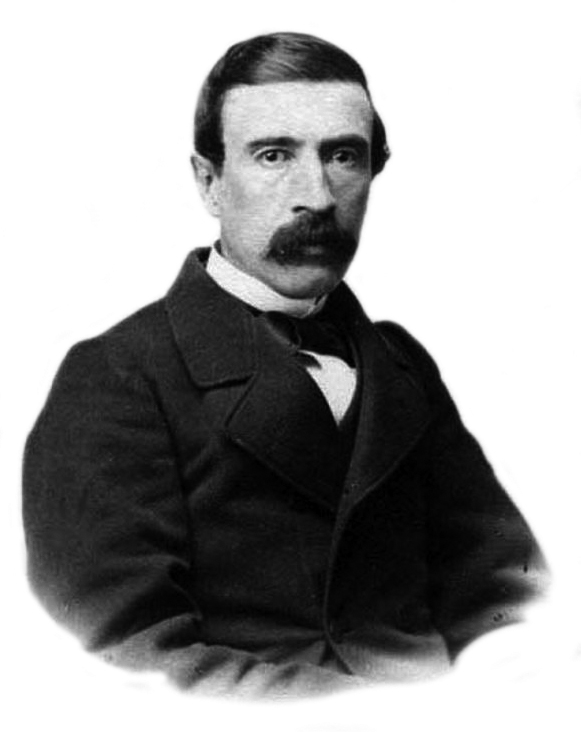

Minister of Finance
- In office 1862–1863
- Preceded by: Manuel Rengifo
- Succeeded by: Domingo Santa María

Personal details
- Born: 23 March 1817 Rancagua, Chile
- Died: 14 June 1888 (aged 71) Santiago, Chile
- Party: Liberal
- Spouse: Julia Jesús Villarreal
- Children: Victorino Aurelio Lastarria, 11 others
- Parents: Francisco Lastarria y Cortés (father); Carmen Santander Bozo (mother)
- Education: University of San Felipe
- Profession: Attorney, writer
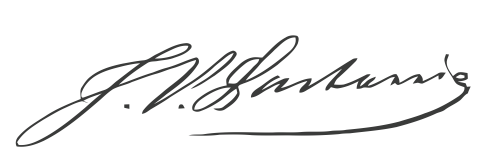
- Signature

José Victorino Lastarria (Spanish pronunciation: [xoˈse βiɣtoˈɾino lasˈtarja]; 23 March 1817 – 14 June 1888) was a Chilean writer, legislative deputy, senator, diplomat, and finance minister. He was a liberal associated with the opposition to the consecutive governments of Joaquín Prieto (1831–1841), Manuel Bulnes (1841–1851), and Manuel Montt (1851–1861).

== Early life ==
José Victorino Lastarria was the son of Francisco Lastarria y Cortés and Carmen Santander Bozo.

He studied in his hometown of Rancagua, and then moved to Santiago when he was granted a scholarship by the government of Francisco Antonio Pinto to the Liceo de Chile, a school then run by José Joaquín de Mora. While there, the Chilean Civil War of 1829–30 occurred, in which the Pipiolos (Liberals) were defeated by the Pelucones (Conservatives). Mora was expelled from the country, which motivated Lastarria to become a revolutionary against what he saw as a dictatorship being installed.

Lastarria married Julia Jesús Villarreal on 8 June 1839, with whom he had 12 children. One was engineer Victorino Aurelio Lastarria.

== Studies ==
Lastarria was a disciple of Andrés Bello in 1834. After graduating from the National Institute, he studied for various careers, earning the titles of geographer and attorney from the University of San Felipe and the Institute of Law and Sacred Canons in 1839.

With a group of students from the National Institute, he formed the Literary Society of 1842, an entity for the dissemination of liberal ideas then prohibited by the government of Manuel Bulnes.

In 1843, Lastarria joined the ranks of the founding professors of the University of Chile.

== Political career ==
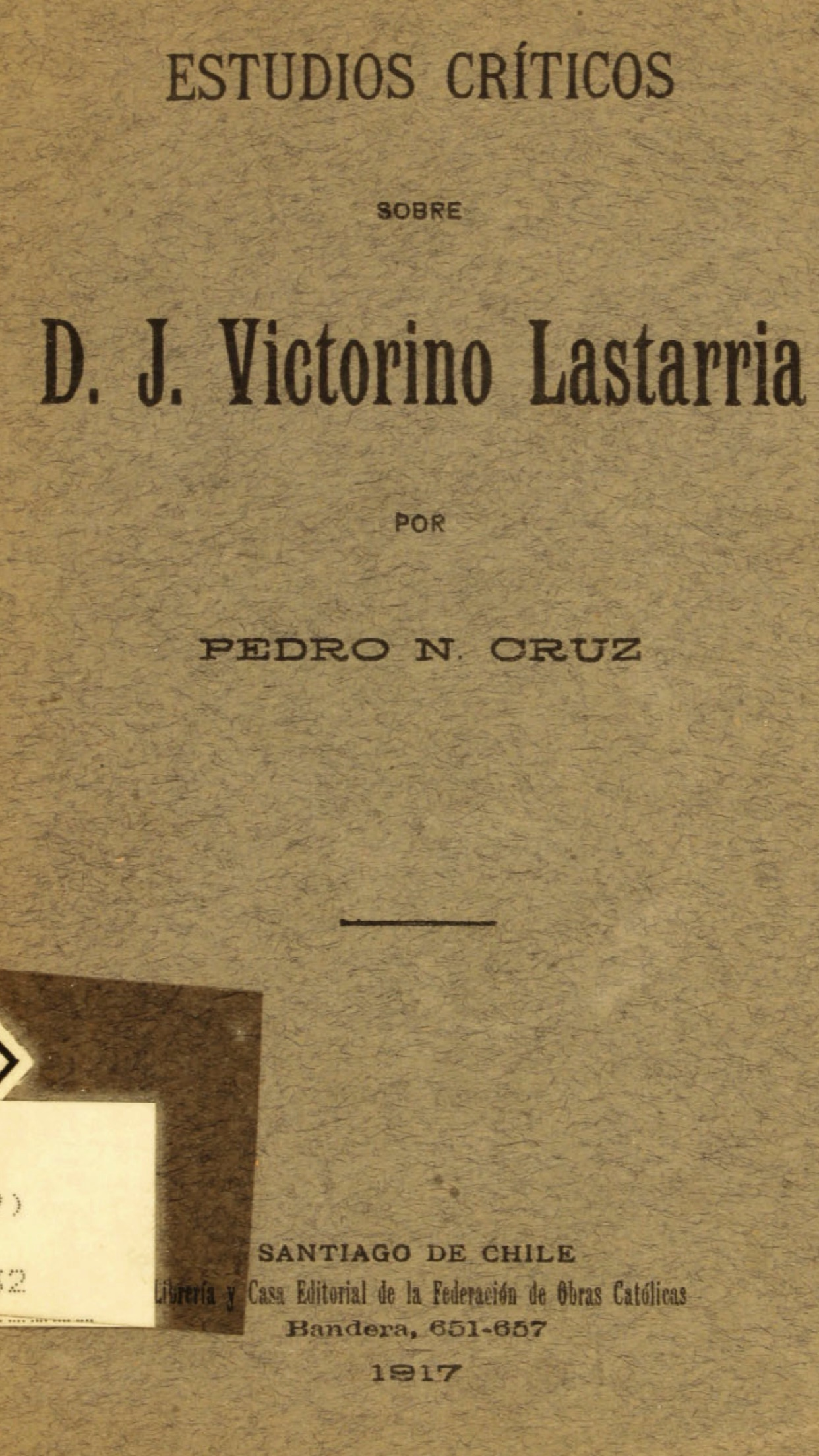
Critical Studies on José Victorino Lastarria, written by Pedro Nolasco Cruz Vergara in 1917

In 1848, with the escalation of repression by the country's Conservative government, Lastarria joined the Society of Equality, a revolutionary group which sought to overthrow Bulnes and the Constitution of 1833. In 1850 he was arrested by the government and sent to Lima. He returned to participate in the Revolution of 1851, seeking to annul the election of Manuel Montt. This was defeated by aggressive government action, and Lastarria escaped back to Peru, labeled one of the "ten most wanted men in Chile". His brother Manuel was arrested by the government.

Lastarria joined other exiles seeking international support to oust the Conservative government. On the advice of Francisco Bilbao, he returned to Chile in 1853, settling in Valparaíso, where he supported mobilizations against the government and joined the Freemasons, a then-unrecognized institution in Chile.

In 1859, after the popular uprising that forced Antonio Varas to abandon his candidacy, Lastarria became one of the main faces of the transition to Liberal government that took place between 1861 and 1871 under the administration of José Joaquín Pérez. At this time, in addition to being dean of philosophy at the University of Chile, he was appointed Minister of Finance, where he tried to impose social market economic concepts, without much success.

In 1860 he published a notable fantasy novel with a political tone, Don Guillermo. It denounced the lack of social freedom under conservative governments through an allegory with Mapuche myths and legends. It was a brief but intense work which earned him both success and animosity in the years of Conservative-Liberal transition.

In 1862 Lastarria returned to Lima, this time as an ambassador. He was present in 1864 during the Chincha Islands War, which motivated Chile to declare war against Spain.

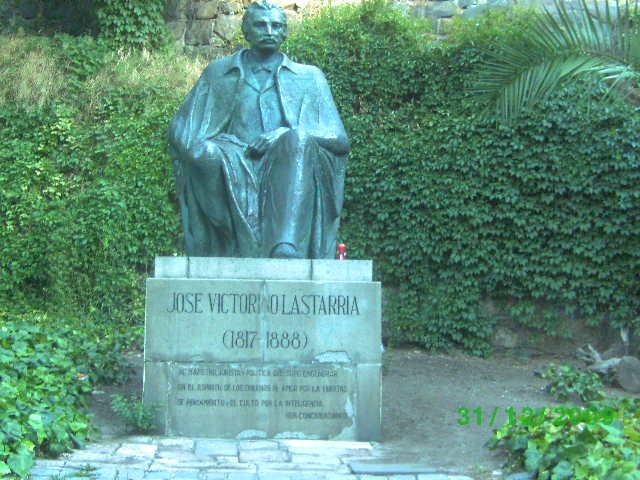
Statue of José Victorino Lastarria on Santa Lucía Hill

In early 1865 he traveled to Argentina, leading a diplomatic mission with the objective of forming an alliance against the Spanish, as well as negotiating the possession of Patagonia. Lastarria proposed an agreement which would grant Argentina almost the entire territory in question, with the exception of Tierra del Fuego and some surrounding areas. However, when he returned to Chile, the government rejected the deal. This was later used by Argentine authorities to justify their subsequent domination of the vast majority of Patagonia. In fact, Lastarria did not think Chile had a valid claim to those territories, and given his Americanist convictions, did not want a war to break out over them.

In 1876 he was appointed Interior Minister by President Aníbal Pinto. In this period he created the Diario Oficial, which became Chile's official government gazette.

In 1879, during the War of the Pacific, Lastarria was sent to Brazil in order to prevent that country from supporting any of Chile's enemies. He completed this task successfully.

Lastarria also served as minister of the Court of Appeals (1875) and the Supreme Court (1883), a deputy in several legislatures (for Caldera and Copiapó in 1855, Valparaíso in 1858, and La Serena in 1867), and a corresponding member of the Royal Spanish Academy (1870).

== Tributes ==
On 1 June 1913, President Ramón Barros Luco and University of Chile rector Domingo Amunátegui Solar inaugurated Liceo José Victorino Lastarria (José Victorino Lastarria High School) in his honor.

A Liceo José Victorino Lastarria was also established in his hometown of Rancagua.

== See also ==
- Francisco Bilbao
- Pedro Nolasco Cruz Vergara

Preceded by: Manuel Rengifo	Minister of Finance; 1862-1863	Succeeded by: Domingo Santa María
