= Mutiny of Cambiazo =

Part of the failed 1851 Chilean Revolution

The failed Mutiny of Cambiazo occurred during the 1851 Chilean Revolution in Punta Arenas.

Digital reconstruction of the flag carried by Cambiazo's men

The leader of the mutiny, José Miguel Cambiazo, had arrived to Punta Arenas as part of the company "La Fija de Magallanes". In October 1851, 29 convicts arrived to Punta Arenas, among them 7 liberal rebels who had been defeated in April 1851. After an incident involving another officer Cambiazo was incarcerated. In November 1851 Cambiazo made a failed attempt to capture the barque Tres Amigos. The military commander of Punta Arenas, Benjamín Muñoz Gamero, pardoned Cambiazo for this attempt.

In November 21, Cambiazo and other mutineers took control of the colony with the aid of other liberal soldiers. Muñoz was made prisoner. The Chilean government requested intervention by Britain to suppress the mutiny. The Chilean ships Indefatigable and Meteoro plus the Royal Navy ship HMS Virago participated in the recapture of Punta Arenas.
