= Santiago Arcos =

Chilean journalist, politician and writer

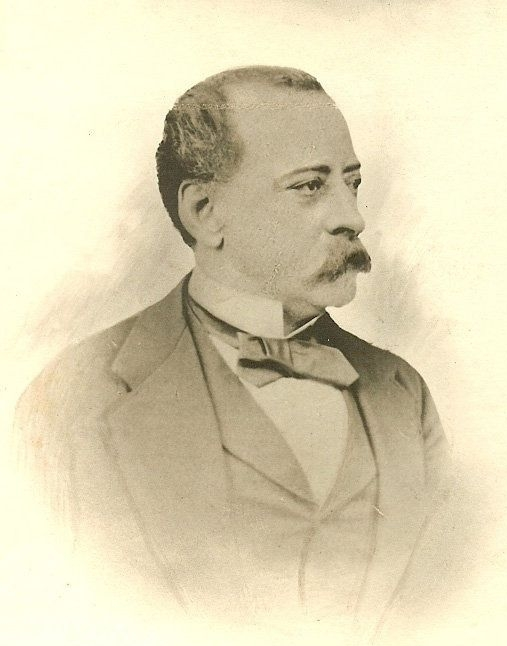
Santiago Arcos

Santiago Arcos (1822–1874) was a Chilean journalist, politician and writer. He wrote a treatise La cuestion de los indios: las fonteras y los indios (1860), that called for military action against indigenous people.

== Early life ==
Arcos was the fourth and last son of Spanish-born businessman and revolutionary military engineer Antonio Arcos and Isabel Petronila Arlegui Rodriguez.

After the fall of Bernardo O'Higgins in 1823, Arcos' parents fled to Paris, eventually establishing a financial concern.

== Return to Chile ==
Not satisfied with life in France, Arcos defies his father's wishes and becomes involved in revolutionary politics, eventually returning to Chile through the United States and becoming involved with the reformist elements in Valparaíso.

Following the Revolutions of 1848, his father eventually followed him in returning to Chile, establishing Chile's first bank.

However, the bank's existence was short lived, closing in 1850 following government pressure.

Arcos refused to return to Europe with his father and eventually co-founded the Sociedad de Igualidad, a revolutionary organization that helped spearhead the 1851 Chilean Revolution.

Eventually, Arcos fled to Peru and later to Argentina, trying to aid revolutionary efforts in Chile from afar.

== Later life ==
Arcos would return to Paris in 1865 after years of revolutionary activity in South America.

After being diagnosed with throat cancer, Arcos committed suicide by drowning himself in the River Seine in January 1869.

== Works ==
- Cuentos de tierra adentro o extracto de los apuntes de un viajero, 1849
- L'utilité de vaincre dans les localités de la République Argentine
- Les frontières et les Indiens
- La Plata, une étude historique, 1865
- Sociabilidad chilena
