= Benjamín Muñoz Gamero =

Chilean governor (1817–1851)

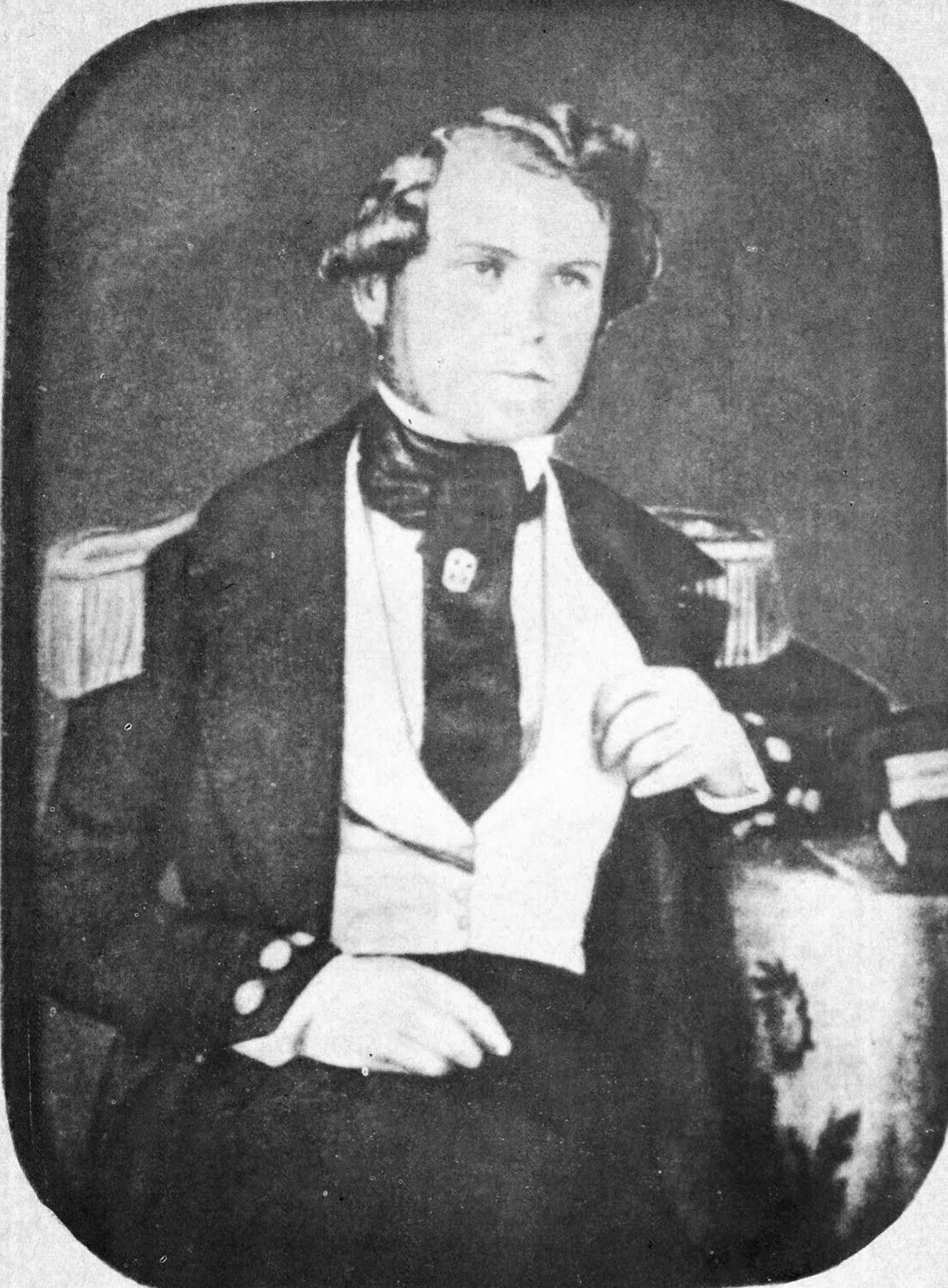
Benjamín Muñoz Gamero

Benjamín Muñoz Gamero (Mendoza, Argentina, March 31, 1817 – Punta Arenas, Chile, December 3, 1851) was a Chilean naval officer, senator and governor of Punta Arenas in the Straits of Magellan. He was killed during the Mutiny of Cambiazo in 1851.

Muñoz Gamero Peninsula is named after him.

== See also ==
- Bernhard Eunom Philippi

== Sources ==
- Castillo Infante, Fernando; Cortés, Lia and Fuentes, Jordi (1996). Diccionario Histórico y Biográfico de Chile. Editorial Zig-Zag, Santiago de Chile, pp. 331–332.
