= Medium Support Vehicle System =

Canadian Army vehicles

The Medium Support Vehicle System (MSVS) is a designation for two types of medium capacity logistics trucks used by the Canadian Army: the Standard Military Pattern (SMP) for use by the regular forces and for overseas deployments, and the Militarized Commercial Off-The-Shelf (MilCOTS) trucks for use by the Army Reserve and for domestic purposes. The two MSVS designs were procured to replace the army's fleet of "Medium Logistics Vehicle, Wheeled" (MLVW) trucks built by Bombardier Inc. in 1982-83.

== Procurement History ==
The Canadian Army's MLVW trucks were delivered beginning in 1982, and had an anticipated 15-year lifespan. However, by the turn of the century the MLVW fleet still had not been replaced. The Department of National Defence (DND) and Canadian Armed Forces (CAF) officially identified a replacement project in October 2000, but approval to proceed with procurement did not come until 2003, when then-defence minister John McCallum approved a DND/CAF plan to sole source 1,500 trucks from the United States Army, who were in the midst of their own procurement program for approximately 83,000 units. The plan to pursue the option from the US Army was expected to save approximately $300 million (CAD) versus procuring an entirely new truck of their own, but federal government bureaucrats and domestic industry strongly opposed the plan and government support fell through.

By January 2004 the DND warned that the MLVWs were in such poor condition that they could catastrophically fail without warning. The trucks' poor condition resulted in annual operating costs of $49,500 per truck per 10 000 km, including $38,900 for spare parts alone. Extrapolated over the following ten years it was expected that keeping the MLVWs for another decade would cost over $1 billion. The Liberal government under Prime Minister Paul Martin pledged $2.5 billion in their 2005 defence budget toward a new generation of medium-sized logistics trucks, but no definitive spending announcement had been made by the 2006 Canadian federal election.

After the Conservative government of Stephen Harper was elected their first budget included the MSVS program, which would see $1.1 billion spent on five phases of procurement:

1. 1,300 MilCOTS trucks for use by the Reserves in domestic operations,
2. 995 ISO container-based mobile workspaces, or "shelters" (including medical, dental, workshop, field kitchen, command post),
3. "kitting" of the shelters,
4. 1,587 SMP trucks for use by the Regular Army, and
5. infrastructure to support the program

== MilCOTS ==
The contract for MSVS MilCOTS trucks was awarded to Navistar Defense in January 2009. They provided 1,300 Navistar 7400 trucks based on the civilian International WorkStar, in six different configurations:

- 895 Troop Carrying Vehicle (TCV)
- 128 Cargo trucks with tarp & cage
- 32 Cargo trucks with a 16 ft long open deck and crane
- 100 Flatbed trucks
- 94 Artillery trucks with a nine-person cab
- 51 Auger trucks with a nine-person cab

== SMP ==
MSVS SMP

Overview
- Manufacturer: Mack Defense (Renault Trucks)
- Also called: Renault Kerax 8x8

Body and chassis
- Layout: front-engine, eight-wheel drive

Powertrain
- Engine: 10.8 L Renault DXi 11 straight-six; 460 hp, 1655 ft•lb
- Transmission: 6-speed Allison 4500SP automatic

Dimensions
- Wheelbase: 6,765 mm (266.3 in)
- Length: 10,392 mm (409.1 in)
- Width: 3,200 mm (126.0 in)
- Height: 3,480 mm (137.0 in)
- Curb weight: 18,132 kg (39,974 lb)

The MSVS Standard Military Pattern contract was awarded on June 11, 2015 to Mack Defense, who provided trucks based on the Renault Kerax (Mack is a subsidiary of the Volvo Group, which also owns Renault Trucks). The trucks feature four driven axles with a two-speed ZF VG2000-300 transfer case for eight-wheel drive, and have a payload capacity of 9,500 kg. The MSVS SMP has both armored and unarmored cab variants and five main configurations:

- 603 Cargo
- 50 Material Handling Crane (MHC)
- 37 Gun Tractor (GT)
- 742 Load Handling System (LHS)
- 155 Mobile Repair Team (MRT)
