= Francisco Bilbao =

Chilean writer, philosopher and politician (1823–1865)

Francisco Bilbao Barquín
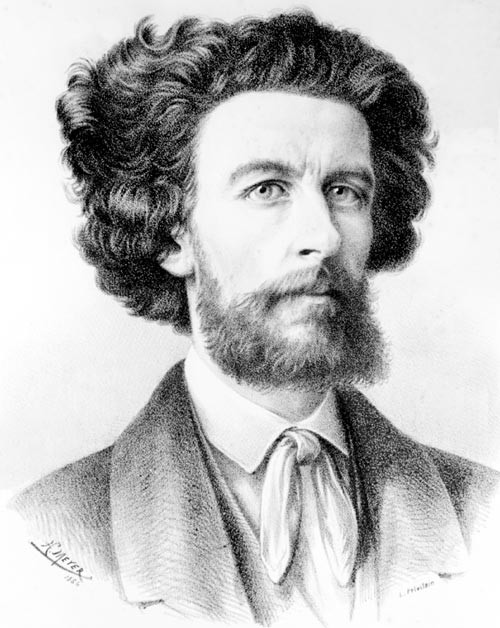
- Born: 19 January 1823; Santiago, Chile
- Died: 9 February 1865 (aged 42); Buenos Aires, Argentina
- Notable work: The Chilean Sociability
- Political party: Liberal

Francisco Bilbao Barquín (Spanish pronunciation: [fɾanˈsisko βilˈβao]; 19 January 1823 – 9 February 1865) was a Chilean writer, philosopher and liberal politician. He was one of the leaders of the unsuccessful revolt against the Chilean government in 1851.

== Early life ==
Francisco Bilbao Barquin was born in Santiago on 9 January 1823 to Rafael Bilbao Beyne and Argentina Mercedes Barquín. His father, an opponent of Diego Portales, was exiled to Lima, Peru in 1829. In Peru he studied astronomy, sciences and music, and also practiced swimming and gymnastics. He returned to Santiago in 1839 and studied at the Instituto Nacional, taking courses including public law, constitutional law, Latin and philosophy, although he did not earn a degree. His teachers included Andrés Bello and José Victorino Lastarria.

== Political career and thought ==
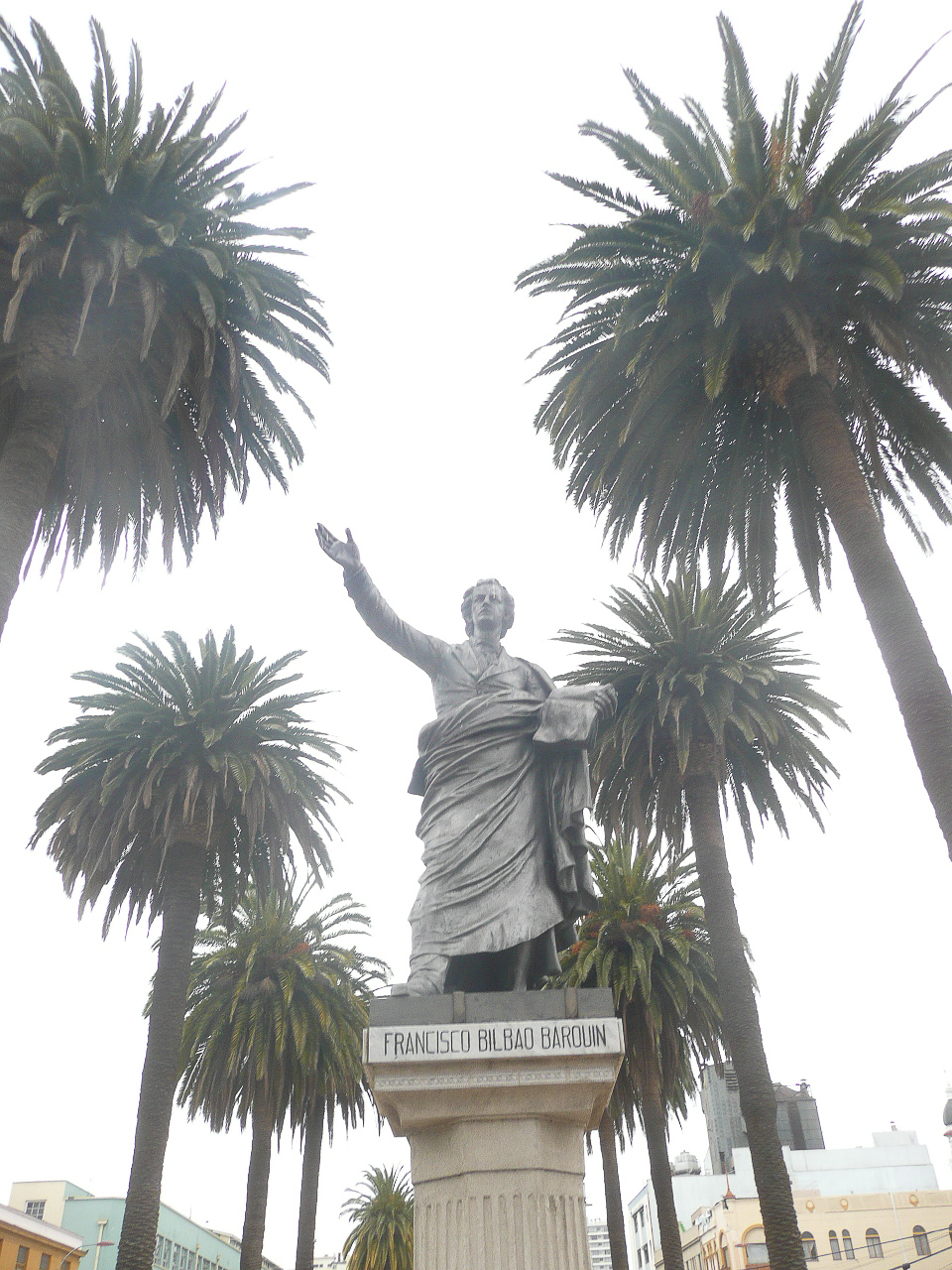
Statue of Francisco Bilbao Barquín in Valparaíso

In 1844 he published his controversial article "The Chilean Sociability" ("La sociabilidad chilena"), which was condemned by Chilean authorities as "blasphemous and immoral, though not subversive." He moved to Paris in 1845, and was there during the 1848 uprising in Paris. He returned to Chile in 1850, the year he also founded the Society of Equality. In 1851 he led an unsuccessful insurrection against the government of Manuel Montt, after which he again had to move to Peru. He never returned to Chile.

In Lima, he joined Peruvian political life. In May 1855 he had to leave the country after being persecuted for criticizing the clergy. He went back to Europe, settling in Paris and Belgium.

In 1857, he returned to the Americas, specifically Argentina. He died in Buenos Aires in 1865, aged 42.

He was one of the first to advocate for the concept of Latin America, referring to South America, formulating the concept "as a direct echo of French anti-Pan-Slavism," in wake of the U.S.-Mexican War (1846–48), in which Mexico lost much of its northern territory to the U.S. and U.S. intervention in Nicaragua. The idea of Latin America was to contest "'Yankee' individualism." For Bilbao, "Latin America" was not a geographical concept, since he excluded Brazil, then a monarchy with a black slave economy, and also Paraguay. He also excluded Mexico from his conception, since it had an entangled relationship with the United States, and in his view seemed united only in its opposition to the U.S. Bilbao's thinking on democracy rejected delegated representation (such as a congress or parliament), and "thus advocated a sort of direct and constant self-representation in a Catholic community." Bilbao opposed the Chilean war against the Araucanian or Mapuche peoples in southern Chile, who had never been conquered during the colonial era, with Bilbao supporting their autonomy.

Bilbao conceived of the Americas as having two main cultural contours. "America, in its two-fold nature as Saxon and Latin, witnesses not the contradiction of ideas, as in Europe, but the exclusivity of ideas. America has crippled harmony. Harmony is individualism and sociability. The North embodies individualism; the South, sociability. The Saxon-Yankee is Protestant and federal; the Spanish American is Catholic and a centralizer... the Yankee is the centrifugal force; the American from the South is the centripetal force. Both are necessary for order to exist."

== Works ==
- "La sociabilidad chilena" in El Crepúsculo, June 1844
- América en peligro. 1862
- El evangelio americano 1864
- Obras completas de Francisco Bilbao. Vol. 1. Buenos Aires, 1866.

== See also ==
- Latin America
