= Revista de Marina =

- Language: Spanish

Publication details
- History: 1885 to present

Standard abbreviations
- ISO 4: Rev. Mar.

Revista de Marina is a bimonthly magazine published by the Chilean Navy since 1885. Its scope is "naval and maritime thought" relating to Chile or foreign countries. The headquarters is in Valparaíso. The magazine covers topics of the naval profession and those of national interest including the use of naval power, the promotion of national maritime interests, knowledge of history, science, the arts, nautical sports, commerce and those other activities related to the sea.
