= Machi weye =

A Machi Weye is a male Machi (Mapuche shaman) who possesses a dual or gender-fluid identity (a mix of feminine and masculine attributes) in the Mapuche worldview. Traditionally they are described as men with sacred feminine characteristics who practiced special rituals. In Mapudungun, the word weye (also written as huey) refers to homosexual men or transgender bottoms, which is why the Machi Weye are usually associated with gender-variant shamanic roles. These gender identities do not follow the western concept of gender binary.

== History ==
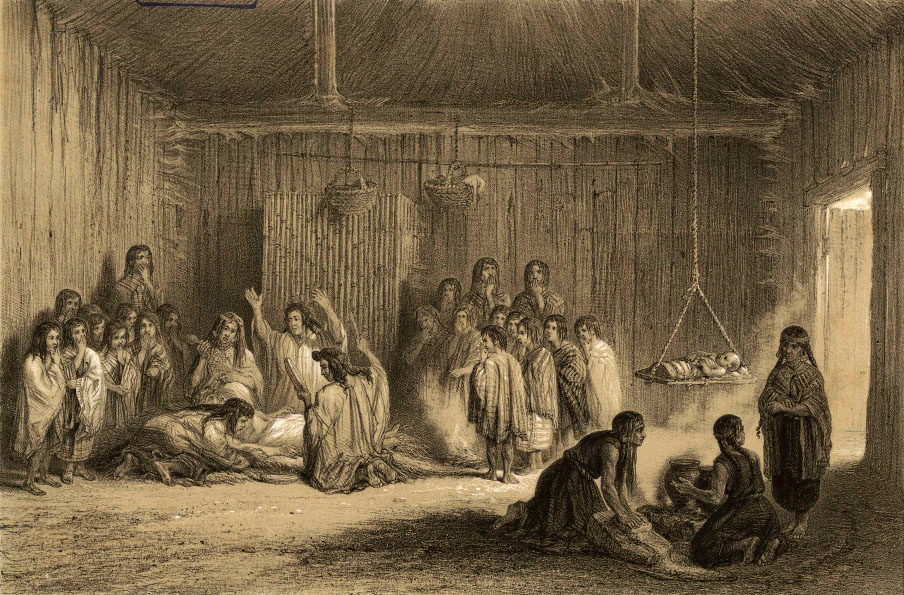
Engraving of a machitún (healing ceremony) performed by Machis (1854)

In pre-Columbian times, the Machi Weye occupied a place of respect within Mapuche communities. Colonial chronicles described rituals directed by these shamans. For example, in August 1629 writer and soldier Francisco Núñez de Pineda y Bascuñán tells how "a Machi Weye, a shaman man" cured an ill Mapuche juvenile with the help of canelo, a tree sacred to the Mapuche, and ancestral spirits. In this text, the Machi Weye appears dressed in feminine attire (a poncho or pinafore, with long hair) during the ritual, demonstrating their unique condition. Until the 18th century, according to indigenous testimonies, these shamans enjoyed considerable spiritual influence. They were considered "two-spirit" people by combining masculine and feminine energies.

According to historian and ethnologist Tomás Guevara, young unmarried Mapuche men that maintained homosexual relations were not subject to persecution nor social or legal condemnation and were considered natural when done with Machi Weyes, and as a result these men did not stay closeted. Furthermore, it was believed that keeping these relationships secret could attract punishments from higher powers, manifesting in severe illness or malformation in future children. Linguist Elisa Loncon indicates that the term weye or weyun could be translated as "gay" or "homosexual man".

The situation changed drastically with the Spanish conquest. The colonial authorities interpreted the role of Machi Weye with prejudice, and they were stigmatized with derogatory terms such as puto or sodomite in their chronicles. The attempt to Christianize the indigenous peoples forced the Machi Weyes and Machi women to submit to colonial norms of "sexual correctness" and convert to Christianity to avoid the Spanish threat to persecute the Mapuche people. With time, the figure of Machi Weye disappeared from the Mapuche public spere as religious persecution and social pressure drastically reduced their numbers. By the 19th century, there were very few men that practiced as Machi, and in general wore masculine clothing in daily life, unlike the ancient weye.

== Characteristics and functions ==
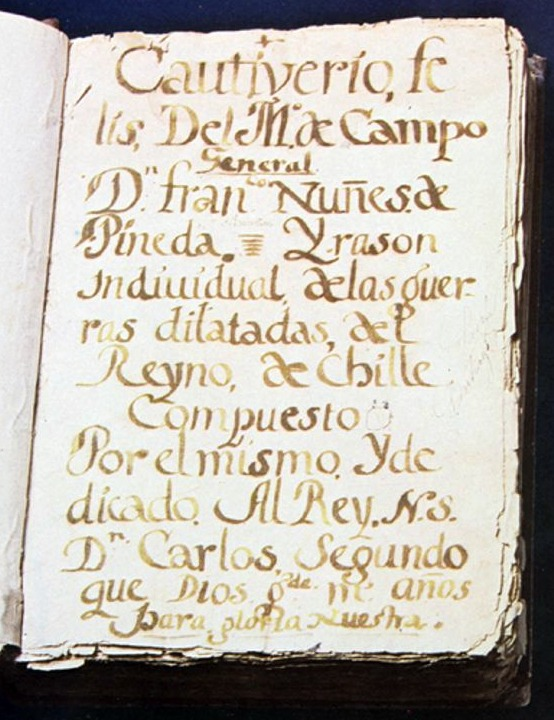
Cover of Cautiverio feliz (Happy Captivity), a work written by Núñez de Pineda y Bascuñán during his captivity by the Mapuche in the 17th century. It recounts the encounter between the Mapuche and Spanish cultures, offering testimony about indigenous people's customs and the intercultural relations of the era. Written in 1673 and published in 1863 in Santiago de Chile.

Because of the eurocentrism and bias of the chroniclers and historians that documented the Mapuche, it is difficult to accurately determine the conduct of the shamans. The descriptions are contaminated with the Spanish Empire's own moral judgements that interpreted many of their practices as pagan acts or demonized perversions. This is evidenced by Núñez de Pineda y Bascuñán in their work Happy Captivity:

"Parecía un Lucifer en sus facciones, talle y traje, porque andaba sin calzones (chamal), pues éste era de los que llaman hueyes (invertido pasivo). Traía en lugar de calzones un puno, que es una mantichuela, que traen por delante de la cintura para abajo, al modo de indias, y unas camisetas largas encima. Traía el cabello largo, siendo así que todos los demás andan trenzados. Las uñas tenia tan diformes, que parecían cucharas. (Era) muy pequeño de cuerpo, algo espaldudo y rengo (rengo: cojo por lesión en las caderas) de una pierna, (de modo) que sólo mirarle causaba horror y espanto: con que daba a entender sus viles ejercicios" (...) "Se ponen las gargantillas, anillos y otras alhajas mujeriles, siendo muy estimados y respetados de hombres y mujeres, porque hacen con éstas el oficio de hombres y con aquellos de mujeres... Les llaman hueyes, que en nuestro vulgar (idioma) son nefandos y que (también) en entre ellos se tienen por viles, por acomodarse...".

["He looked like Lucifer in his features, waist, and suit, because he was walking around without his underwear (chamal) because he was one of those so-called Weyes (homosexual bottoms). Instead of wearing trousers, he wore a loincloth which hangs from the waist in a manner similar to Indian women, with a long shirt on top. He had long hair, whereas everyone else wore braids. His nails were so deformed that they looked like spoons. He was very small in stature with a somewhat wide back and was lame in one leg, in a manner that just looking at him caused horror and fright, with which he made his vile practices known" ... "They wear choker necklaces, rings, and other women's jewelry, and are highly esteemed and respected by men and women because they perform men's jobs with the latter and women's work with the former ... They call themselves Weyes, which in our language means heinous (sodomites), which [the others] should also be considered for accommodating them..."]

— Francisco Núñez de Pineda y Bascuñán, Happy Captivity

While practicing rituals, many wear feminine clothing (long skirts, scarfs, necklaces) to attract the healing spirit. As has been observed by anthropologist Ana Mariella Bacigalupo, the Machi Weye combined "the feminine spiritual power with the masculine political power", which allow them to mediate between the human and spiritual planes within Mapuche social structure.

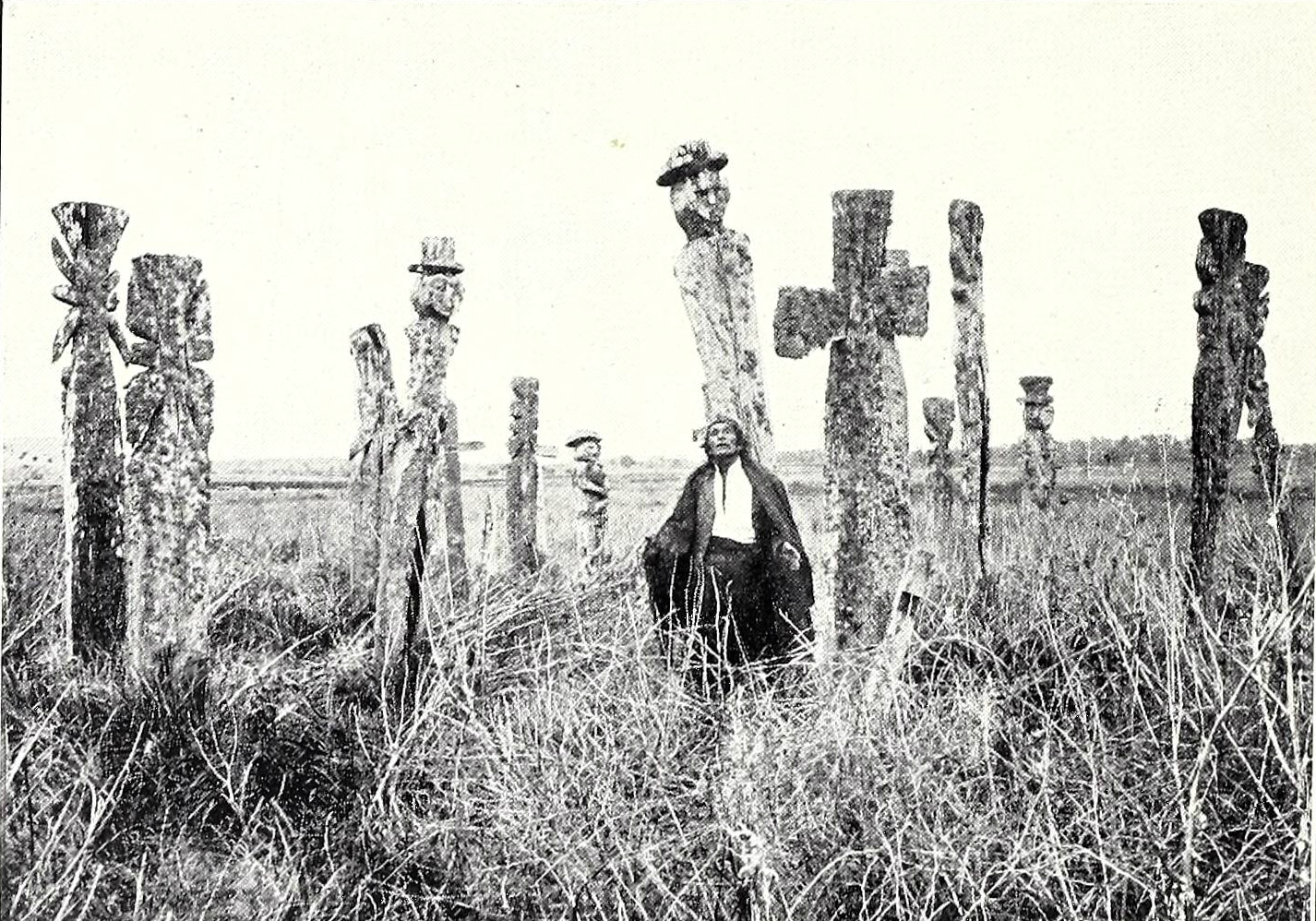
A Machi in a Mapuche cemetery in 1904

The Machi Weyes performed the fundamental functions of sacrifice, health, and divination within the community. Their main role was that of a shamanic healer, entering into a trance to diagnose and cure illnesses, especially those attributed to spells and malign spirits. For example, Pineda y Bascuñán in Happy Captivity described a Machi Weye opening the chest of a lamb, placing its heart on a canelo, and using its smoke to draw out the poison from a sick young man, miraculously curing him. These rituals, or machitun, included drums, women's songs, and tobacco offerings, reflecting the fusion of feminine and masculine elements in the ceremony.

Furthermore, the Machi Weye were mediators between the people and the spiritual world of warriors and ancestors. According to Bacigalupo, their dual gender permitted them to wage spiritual war in defense of the community. They could invoke Mapuche spirits to attack their enemies in the supernatural plane with thunder, lightning, and spells; for example, the latter could be done by blowing tobacco smoke in enemy territory. Lunar, solar, and planetary spells served to strengthen fighters or avenge grievances.

In summary, their functions included advising the chieftains (lonko) about strategies, protecting the health of the people and ensuring the fertility of the land, taking advantage of their connection to femininity (healing, growth) to masculinity (protection, war). As sons of prominent chiefs, they initiated their role through dreams and trances learning medicinal herbs and healing techniques just like female Machi.

== Modern era ==
The figure of Machi Weye has been reinterpreted in modern debates about gender and ethnicity. During the European colonization period it provoked controversy, with Catholic chroniclers denounced their practices as witchcraft and 'sodomy'.

In the present day, some Mapuche activists argue that these shamans were part of the diversity of gender in amongst ancient indigenous people that disappeared during colonization.

Other specialists warn that their identity doesn't fit into modern categorizations, as they cannot be simply be treated as "masculine gay" or "transgender" according to western models, but a ritual role with its own meaning.

As shown by a 2004 ethnographic study, the femininity of a person like "Marta" (a Machi Weye) continues to create controversy in the present-day, even within current Mapuche society.

In practice, the figure of Machi Weye has not survived in a clear form to the present day; their absence in contemporary community life has sparked academic discussions about how to define the indigenous genders without interpreting them with external biases and prejudice.

== Works ==
- You will never be a Weye (Nunca serás un weye) (2015), video performance by Seba Calfuqueo.

== See also ==
- Machi
- Homosexuality in Mapuche culture
