= Lorenzo Aillapán =

Chilean poet, actor, producer, and artisan

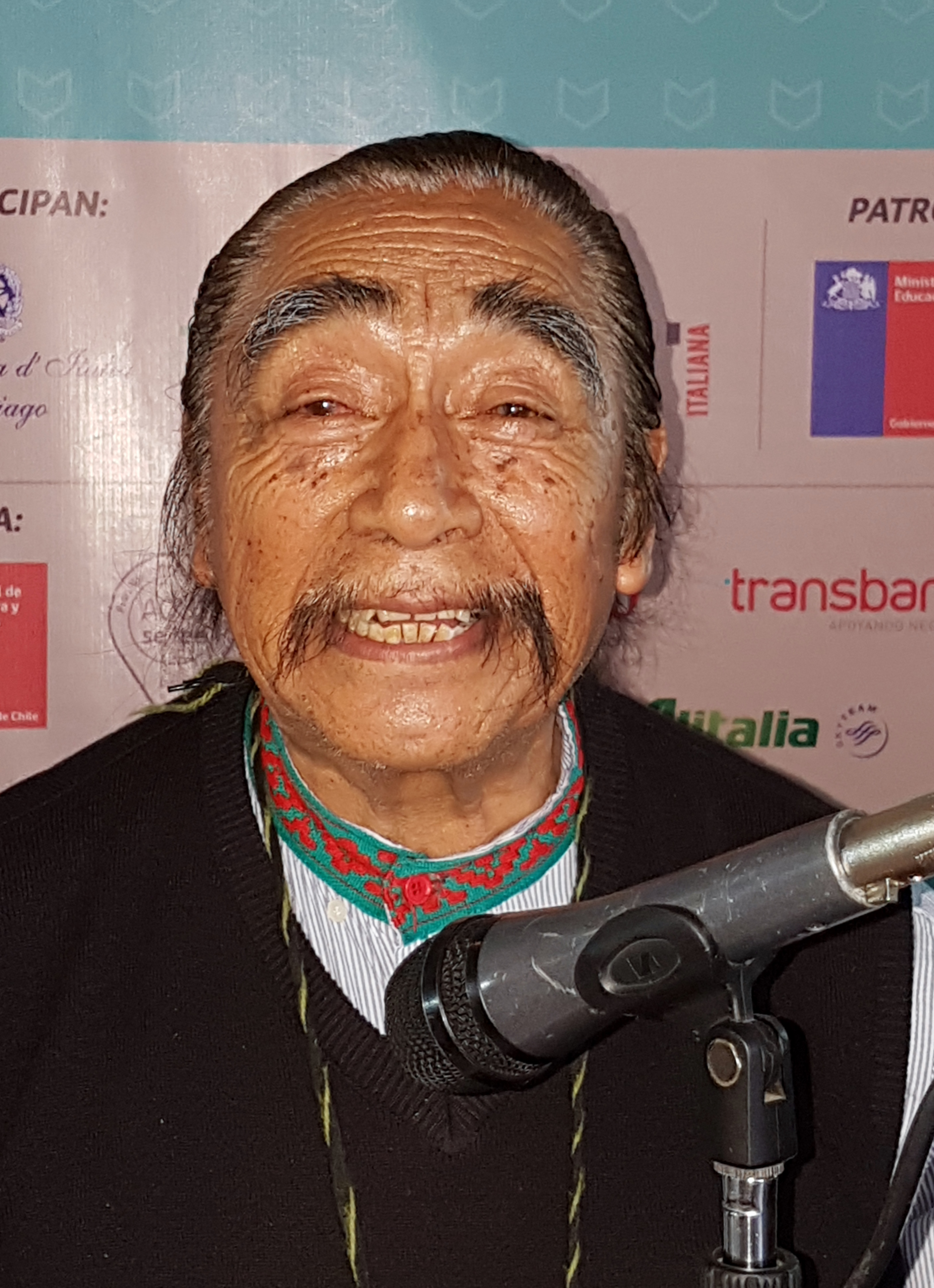
- Aillapán at the 2017 Santiago International Book Fair
- Born: Lorenzo Aillapán Cayuleo; 10 March 1940 (age 85); Rukathraru Community, close to Budi Lake, Chile
- Other names: Üñümche

Lorenzo Aillapán Cayuleo (born 10 March 1940), also known by his indigenous name "Üñümche" ("Bird man")[1], is a Chilean poet, actor, film producer, anthropologist, teacher, and artisan of Mapuche ent. In 2012, he was recognized as a living human treasure in his country, while in October 2022, the University of Magallanes and the Catholic University of Temuco gave him the award of Master of Masters in Biocultural Knowledge. He has actively participated in the foundation and leadership of various representative organizations of the indigenous Mapuche people.

== Biography ==
Lorenzo Aillapán was born in the Rukathraru Community (close to the Budi Lake of the Araucanía Region) to Juan Segundo Aillapán Lefio and María Isabel Cayuleo Deunacán. His paternal grandfather, Juan Aillapán, was a lonko chief who owned 300 hectares of land. Spanish was his second language taught to him in school, as he first learnt the native language of Mapudungun. As a young boy, he always showed a natural interest in bird noises and nature in general.

At the age of six, he had a pewma ceremony, in which he was consecrated with the spirit of the Mapuche birdman. After this, he dedicated many years to cultivating and developing an original literary genre: the interpretation of birdsongs. Among the Mapuche, this is part of a communication process established over time between man and nature; The interpretation of the sound and silence of the environment is a daily act in a continuous process of integral relationship that the Mapuche have transformed into artistic expression.

He completed secondary education at the B-17 High School in Nueva Imperial and then studied journalism at the Technical University of the State for two years. A versatile artist, he has studied nutrition, knowledge of Mapuche musical instruments, medicinal plants, carpentry, and construction. He is also the author of the Mapuche shorthand writing system.

Between 1993 and 1994, he was the lead actor and advisor in the film Wichan: The Trial, directed by Magaly Meneses and based on a story by Pascual Coña, with dialogues in Mapudungún; Three years later, he played Luancura in Cristián Sánchez's film Happy Captivity, based on the work of the same name by 16th century Spanish nobleman Francisco Núñez de Pineda y Bascuñán written during his years of captivity at the hands of the Mapuche tribe.

He is considered one of the most prominent exponents of Mapuche culture in Chile. Internationally, he is known for his poetic work, which earned him the first prize for Literature in the Indigenous Language awarded by Casa de las Américas in Havana in 1994. Defender of the cultural values and demands of the Mapuche, he has participated in different international forums; In Sweden, he has become known through the radio documentary Fågelmanen, made by journalist Juan Diego Espoeres.

In 2001 he published the album 20 poemas alados (20 Winged Poems). Two years later he published the book 72 pájaros (72 Birds).
