= Joven Daniel =

Chilean naval ship (1838–1849)

Coordinates: 38°57′17″S 73°20′03″W

History
- Name: Soverence
- Commissioned: 1831
- Fate: Acquired by the Chilean Navy to serve as transport in the War of the Confederation

Chile
- Commissioned: 1838
- Renamed: Joven Daniel
- Honours and awards: War of the Confederation
- Fate: Wrecked off the coast of Budi Lake, 1849

General characteristics
- Type: Brigantine
- Tonnage: 180 gross tons
- Notes: Built in Linn

Joven Daniel was a brigantine of the Chilean Navy that entered service in 1838 serving as transport in Manuel Bulnes' expedition to Peru during the War of the Confederation. The ship became later known for its wreck off the coast of Araucanía in 1849. As it wrecked in territory outside (Note: Domingo Faustino Sarmiento stated: Between two Chilean provinces (Concepción and Valdivia) there is a piece of land that is not a province, its language is different, it is inhabited by other people and it can still be said that it is not part of Chile. Yes, Chile is the name of the country over where its flag waves and its laws are obeyed.) Chilean government control, Chilean authorities struggled to elucidate the fate of possible survivors amidst inter-indigenous accusations of looting, murder and other atrocitities among local Mapuche. The events spinning off the wreckage fueled strong anti-Mapuche sentiments in Chilean society, contributing years later to the Chilean resolution to invade their hithereto independent territories.

== Wreckage and aftermath ==
=== First reports ===
In the night of 31 July 1849 the ship was heading to Valdivia from Valparaíso when it wrecked at the coast between the mouths of Imperial and Toltén River. More specifically it ran aground and wrecked at the rocky shore at Puancho, near Budi Lake. Chilean authorities learned about the events the first week of August when a Mapuche known as Santiago Millaguir reported the events.

Reportedly Millaguir had visited the site of the wreck six days after the events and said to the Chileans that the survivors had been murdered and the cargo stolen. Further, surviving children and women were kidnapped and then raped and murdered. He pointed out the people of local Mapuche cacique Curin as responsible for these misdeeds. The Chilean state sent Joaquín Sayago to investigate the issue and while he failed to find Curin and his people he was able to contact the tribes of Toltén south of the place of the wreck. The Mapuche of Toltén were in possession of various items from the wreck and were willing to hand back items such as paper, cloth and gold. Attempts to find the graves of the supposed survivors near the beach proved unsuccessful. In further enquiries Sayago and the capitanes de amigos who assisted him learned that the "general voice" among the Mapuche was that there had been no survivors of the wreck. This appeared to be at odds with the Chilean investigation that described the place of the wreck as a beach where the wrecked could have reached land.

=== New witnesses and parliament ===
The intendant of Valdivia sent Miguel José Cambiazo (Note: After his service in Valdivia, Cambiazo was transferred to Punta Arenas where he initiated a mutiny.) in charge of a military detachment north to arrest Curin and his people and bring them to justice. Cambiazo returned to Valdivia with various Mapuche witnesses who described how survivors, including children and women, had been raped and murdered. President Manuel Bulnes' opposition called for a punitive expedition and Mapuches prepared for a confrontation with the Chilean Army. General José María de la Cruz (Note: A few years later, in 1851, José María de la Cruz received considerable Mapuche support in his bid to overthrow newly elected President Manuel Montt. According to historian José Bengoa, the Mapuches saw the central government in Santiago as their main enemy, explaining their participation on the side of José María de la Cruz in the Concepción-based revolt.) who was commander of southern forces of the Chilean Army, and the likely leader of a punitive expedition, called Mapuche caciques from the area near the wreck to a parliament. The Mapuche leaders that gathered showed considerable goodwill towards the Chilean interests cursing those accused of murder and theft.

=== Trials ===
Mapuches handed over some of the accused of looting to be tried in Concepción and Valdivia. At the trials some defendants said they had not participated in looting and while others admitted looting, all of them however denied the charges of murder because there would have been no survivors. Mapuches further claimed all the loot had been given to Sayago's assistant, but the amounts said by the Mapuche did not match to what Sayago handed over back in Valdivia. Thus, there was a possibility that Sayago or someone in his group were involved in embezzlement.

In a letter attached to the trial documents José Antonio Zúñiga, a soldier active in the expedition of Sayago, (Note: Also a former member of the outlaw gang of the Pincheira brothers.) described the coast of Puancho as rocky, thus showing earlier descriptions of the site of the wreck as a beach wrong. He further put forward the thesis that murder accusations among the Mapuche originated from quarrels about the loot since many groups had rapidly gathered at the wreck site. This hypothesis meant Chilean authorities would have been drawn into an inter-Mapuche conflict.

Catalina Ayinman who Miguel José Cambiazo had previously brought to Valdivia to witness was called to witness again in Concepción. This time she claimed that her previous "declarations" had been fabrications as she would have been in Mehuín, far to the south at the time of the wreckage. She would have been in exile there because of accusations of Kalku Witchcraft from her husband and Curin who was her uncle. In subsequent arguments Catalina Ayinman openly accused Miguel José Cambiazo to have fabricated with pressure and distortion her first "declarations".

Bulnes ended up dismissing calls for a punitive expedition in view of its irrelevance to the eventual conquest of Araucanía.

Summary of investigations regarding the wreck

Issue	Conclusion
Site of wreck	Differing descriptions as beach or rocky shore
Murder	General denial among Mapuches, no person would have survived the wreck. At least one eyewitness of murder recanted.
Graves	Said to exist by some, but not found
Looting	Some Mapuche admitted culpability
Fate of loot	Partly recovered, the remaining possibly kept by Mapuches or Valdivian soldiers

=== Cultural impact ===
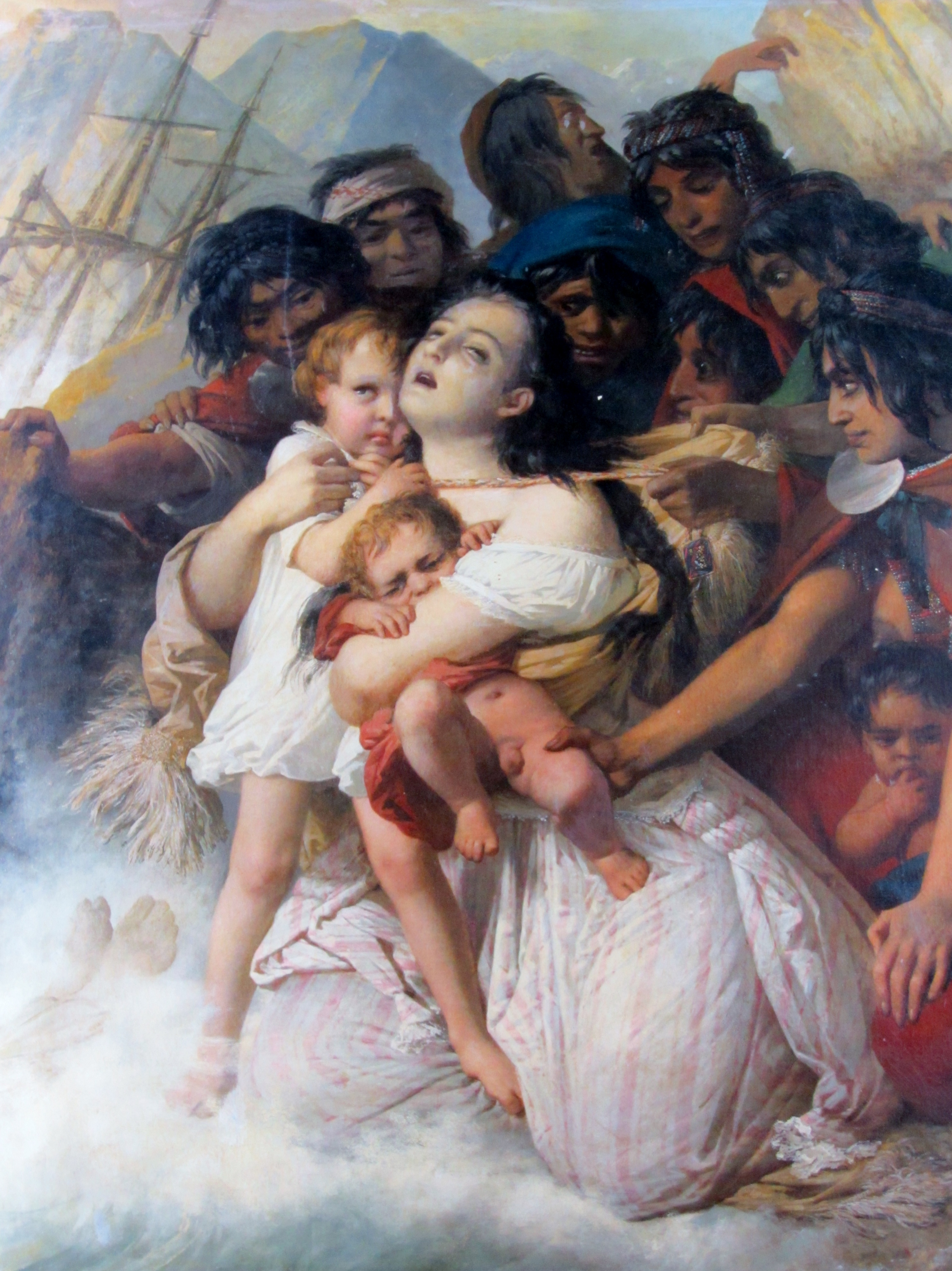
Painting by Raymond Monvoisin showing Elisa Bravo Jaramillo who was said to have survived the wreck to be then kidnapped by Mapuches.

The wreckage had a significant cultural impact in Chile. As the details became known in Santiago they fueled a strong anti-Mapuche sentiment and reaffirmed prejudiced views that the Mapuches were brutal barbarians. For the first time in history the destruction of the Mapuche "race" and culture entered the public debate in Chile. The strong anti-Mapuche sentiments that rose in Chilean society contributed years later to the decision to by Chile to invade their hithereto independent territories.

A passenger of the ship, Elisa Bravo was particularly portrayed as a heroine in two poems by Rafael Santos in 1856. Her purported fate was soon after subject of paintings made by Raymond Monvoisin.

=== Historian's assessment ===
Benjamín Vicuña Mackenna was the first historian to analyse the events concluding that Sayago was innocent of theft and Cambiazo was culpable. Historian Diego Barros Arana concluded no murder had occurred and that Valdivian soldiers had kept part of the loot hiding this with a series of lies and misleading statements. Barros Arana praised the reaction of the central authorities and his views on the subject were later adopted by other notable historians such as Francisco Antonio Encina and Ricardo Ferrando. Using the account of Pascual Coña, a local Mapuche landowner who made a consistent testimony of the assault on the survivors, José Bengoa concludes that the murders were true, but the reliability of this source have been put into doubt as it include some fantastic elements. Valdivian historian Gabriel Guarda changed his mind from initially denying the murders and kidnapping to agreeing that the kidnapping happened. Guarda amended his view after reading an 1863 testimony of Guillermo Cox, a traveller who said to have seen Elisa Bravo.
