= Timeline of LGBTQ history in Chile =

This article is a chronology of the most relevant events for the history of LGBT people in the Captaincy General of Chile and in the modern Republic of Chile.

== Precolumbian Era ==
- For the Mapuche people, sexuality was equal between men and women – a feminine man lost no privileges, power, or status. Originally, the machi shamans were mostly men, wearing clothes and adornments that were considered feminine. This gave them the spiritual power associated with that gender. According to some researchers, the machi weye, as they were called in Mapudungun, were the receptive partner during sex, and accompanied by young men who acted like their husbands. Other researchers think the idea that machis were homosexual or pederasts arose when the Spanish conquistadors came to Chile and applied their own perspective to the very different worldview of the Mapuche.
- The Inca empire, which dominated the northern half of Chile, gave homosexuality religious and sacred significance, and it was commonly practiced—including in lesbian relationships. The friar Gregorio García even described the existence of male prostitutes, dedicated to attending to male clients. Some sources say there was punishment against gay people, but it has also been suggested those accounts were created by moralizing researchers or Spaniards trying to portray the Inca culture as barbaric.
- In the far south of the country, the Aónikenk (also known as the Tehuelche people), tolerated homosexuality among shamans. For the Selk'nam people, male homosexuality escaped the social order, as related in the traditional story "The history of Kokat." The story shows two men who meet and convert to a heterosexual couple; one of the men is changed into a woman and bears them a son.

== 16th century ==
- 25 May, 1598: One of the first accusations of "nefarious sin" (applied to someone who received sodomy) in Chile is applied to the priest Martín Moreno de Velasco. He was suspected to flee across the Rio de la Plata or to Peru.

== 17th century ==
- January 1612: In the summary trial carried out by the governor Juan de la Jaraquemada, 13 Spanish soldiers stationed at Fort Paicaví are accused of sodomy and burned at the stake.
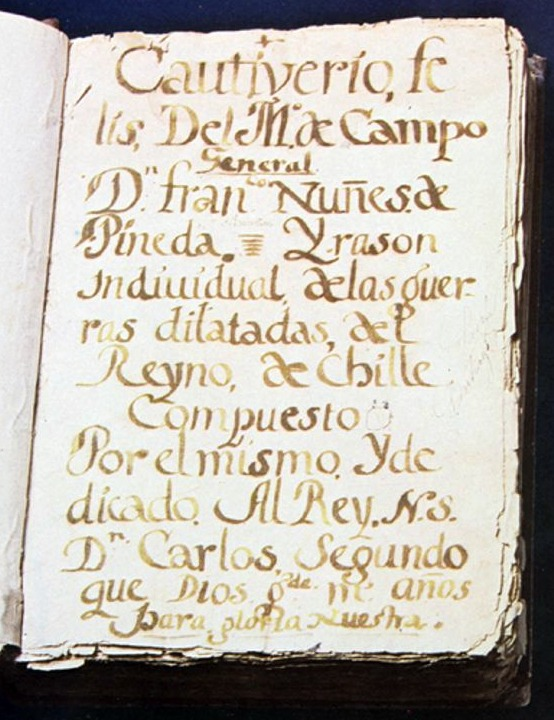
  Original cover of the book Happy Captivity (1673).
- 1673:
  - 14 October: Manuel de León Escobar, judge at the Real Audiencia of Santiago, is accused of having homosexual relations with multiple men, including mullatoes and indigenous men. He is condemned to 13 years of prison in Lima, making him the highest-ranking authority to be charged with sodomy in the Captaincy General of Chile.
  - The book Happy Captivity by the Chilean Spaniard Francisco Núñez de Pineda y Bascuñán is released. It describes the existence of a type of Mapuche shaman, known as machi, who wear feminine clothing and have gay intercourse with other young bachelors from their tribe. This form of homosexuality in Mapuche culture was completely tolerated socially, and there was no persecution enacted by their indigenous justice system.

== 18th century ==
- 9 December, 1793: The chef and tailor Gabino Carrión from Piura is convicted of sodomy in the town of Tarapacá. Despite there not being established evidence of sex acts with other men, he was punished with 25 lashes and was exiled from the area for his insinuations and expressions to some clients.

== 19th century ==
1803

- The Afro-Chilean Francisco Pro is arrested in Alameda de los Descalzos in Lima for wearing the feminine outfit of a tapada limeña, and charged with sodomy at the Real Audiencia of Lima.

1839

- 25 April: The General Ordinance of the Chilean Army is published, governing the function of the country's armed forces. In Article 23, Title LXXX, it outlines the death penalty for soldiers accused of bestiality or sodomy.

1846

- The last death sentence of burning at the stake for sodomy is issued against tavern keeper José Antonio Espinoza, but the execution never takes place. Two years later, a prosecutor from Copiapó attempts to charge a man named Juan Salinas for the same crime, but is rejected by the court.

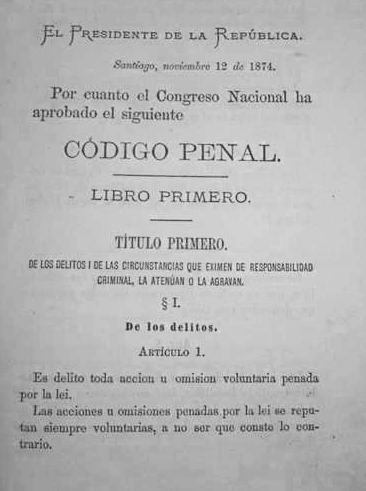
Title page of the first edition of the Chilean Penal Code (1874).

1873

- A case of sodomy is registered between two crew members of the corvette Esmeralda. Carlos Eledna and José Mercedes Casanga are each punished with 60 lashes and 4 years in prison. Navy officer and Chilean national hero Arturo Prat was a member of the jury on the case.

1875

- 1 March: The Penal Code is published, which codifies sodomy as a crime in article 365. Sodomy, even between consenting adults, is punishable by minor imprisonment at a medium degree (a sentence could be between 541 days and 3 years long).

1886

- March through July: The satirical newspaper El Padre Padilla (Father Padilla), edited by Juan Rafael Allende, publishes a series of articles about gay men who are referred to as maricones (translated as faggot or queer). The first of these articles appeared in the March 2nd edition, musing on possible theories for the rise of homosexuality in Santiago, followed by its sequel in the 13 March edition. Beginning in the 26 June edition, a script titled "Comedy of Faggots" caricatured gay men, and was serialized until its completion on 29 July.

1896

- 2 and 6 August: Roberto Marín, a sailor from the armored cruiser Capitán Prat is detained in the city of Coquimbo. He is accused of trying to have homosexual relations with a drunk person, but is released due to a lack of evidence. Four days later, a similar situation occurs when Roberto Gaete and Emilio Figueroa—two more sailors from Capitán Prat—are accused of trying to have sex on Aldunate street, in front of the South American Steamship Company building. They are also released due to lack of evidence.
- Physician Federico Puga Borne publishes his second volume of Compendium of Legal Medicine, describing the characteristics of sodomites and providing instructions for their identification.
- A lira popular (the People's Lyre, a style of poetry) titled "The Faggot Dressed as a Woman" is published. The leaflet was edited by José Hipólito Casas Cordero, and described the story of a young man from Quillota who dressed as a woman and married another man. At the same time, Cordero also published another lira titled "The Girl Dressed as a Man who Married Another Girl in Illapei", about a supposed marriage between two women.

== 20th century ==
=== 1900s ===
1903

- November: Juan Agustín Alcalde Brown, Alberto Leiva and José Perez are tried and imprisoned for sodomy. This court case is one of the first to describe the current gay meeting places in Santiago, mentioning cantinas on Sama Street and the Europa hotel on 21 May Street. In the following decade, Hernán Díaz Arrieta also mentioned Santa Lucia Hill, the railway station Estación Mapocho, and the historic center as meeting places.

=== 1910s ===
1912

- An anonymous essay titled "Sexual Perversions" is published in the journal Anales de la Universidad de Chile (Annals of the University of Chile). This is the first article published in Chile that describes homosexuality from an academic and scientific point of view.

1916

- Salvador Necochea publishes his doctoral thesis at the University of Chile, titled The sexual problem: A brief history of medical sociology, following Sexual perversions as one of the first investigations in the country that refers to the concept of "homosexuality."

1917

- 14 January: In its first edition, the newspaper La Nación covers the case of Luis Pérez Espinoza, who was condemned to 541 days in prison after being caught dressed as a woman and supposedly causing public disturbance. Antonina Pérez, Luis' sister, said he had always been dressed as and treated as a woman by their parents.
- 18 July: The newspaper El Socialista (The Socialist) reports that two members of the Iquique Conservative Club were caught in the act of sodomy, labeling them as decadent and immoral. The article used homosexuality as a way to disparage political opponents.

== 1920s ==
1924

- 12 April: A house at Miguel León Prado 690 in Santiago is raided. Twenty men dressed as women were participating in a private party, and were all arrested and jailed. The leader of the house used the nickname "Lili of Monteblanc."
- September: In the journal Claridad, "Perversiones sexuales" (Sexual Perversions) is published by the doctor Juan Gandulfo Guerra. The article describes homosexuality as a sexual perversion, just like bestiality, masochism, masturbation, and fetishism. It also refers to gay people as sexual inverts who "imitate" the opposite sex, a popular theory at the time, and calls gay may uranistas (Uranians).
- Augusto d'Halmar publishes the novel Pasión y muerte del Cura Deusto (The Passion and Death of Priest Deusto), considered one of the first Latin American novels to address homosexuality.

1926

- 1 March: The Chilean Military Justice Code comes into effect, replacing the General Ordinance of the Chilean Army from 1839 that applied the death penalty to soldiers accused of sodomy.

The group of men in women's clothing arrested in Valparaíso (1927)

1927

- 26 April: A group of gay men are arrested in Valparaíso for cross-dressing. An article in the magazine Sucesos states "In truth, this is an idiotic and repugnant ensemble...[we will] see if the shame of their public appearance teaches them a lesson. The degenerates even use feminine names."
- October: A series of police raids in Santiago lead to 21 gay men being arrested. They are written up for the crime of sodomy and imprisoned in the Public Jail in Santiago.

1928

- August: The lawyer Enrique Broghamer Albornoz publishes his undergraduate thesis, Estudio médio-legal sobre los invertidos (Medical-legal study of the inverts). The thesis is one of the first academic studies on sexual inversion in Chile. He defines both female and male homosexuality as a "genetic inclination towards members of the same sex." Broghamer also includes a definition of bisexuality: "when both inclinations exist simultaneously...often, they are confused with real homosexuals."

1929

- June: The doctor Gregorio Marañón publishes "Homosexuality as an intersex condition" in the journal Medical Review of Chile. He claims "bisexuality of an organism" is a trait of intersexuality that causes homosexuality. Similar to Broghamer, Marañón believes homosexuality to be an innate "anomaly" caused by nature, and that gay people's skeletons and muscles have the opposite sex's "disposition". He also mentions the historical persecution of gay people, including by the Spanish crown, and says "The homosexual shouldn't be punished in any way, as long as he isn't scandalous."
