= Homosexuality in Mapuche culture =

Homosexuality in Mapuche culture is a topic that was historically made taboo since the arrival of the Spanish Conquistadors to present-day Chile and Argentina (Captaincy General of Chile and Viceroyalty of the Río de la Plata, respectively), due to the censorship of homosexuality that was imposed by the Spanish Crown who was close to the Catholic Church, with the criminalization of acts of sex between people of the same sex being classified as sodomy, considered a sin in the religion.

== Background ==
For the Mapuche culture before the arrival of European colonizers, sexuality had a different meaning just like for other pre-Columbian America cultures. The act of sex in the Mapuche worldview related to the renewal of energies, where it is considered a "powerful force, with the ability to create and that encompasses all of human ability".

The Mapuche considered marriage to be an established and well defined institution, that could be monogamous or polygamous depending on factors such as socioeconomic status and hierarchy of the contracting parties within the community (lof), especially of men in the predominantly patriarchal society. In addition, they condemned rape and adultery as acts against nature irrespective of the victim's sexual orientation. Despite this, the Spanish conquistadors justified their actions by arguing that the Amerindians didn't have a clear social order.

The process of evangelization triggered a change in many Mapuche traditions, which had to be modified to European standards to avoid persecution, which happened concurrently with the sociocultural acculturation and syncretism with the Spanish. The Mapuche adopted Spanish ideas about modesty, decorum, and sexual morality to avoid being accused of committing heresy by the Spanish authorities. Given the relative permissively of the Mapuche towards having sexual relations before marriage, potential heretical acts included polygamous marriage, fornication, and homosexual relationships, practice of which ended. In the era before the separation of church and state, it was common to associate sins with crimes/delict, with sexual acts that did not result in reproduction being considered sodomy, defined as anal sex regardless of sexual orientation, with penalties ranging from whipping to imprisonment and death penalty by burning at the stake according to the legal system of Spanish Empire which was in place in Chile and Argentina until the early 19th century.

Regarding homosexual practices, there are only records of sex between men being tolerated socially provided that masculinity was maintained and both men were single. A man who did not marry and preferred to have sexual relations with other men were referred to as 'malleo' by the community, without a negative or discriminatory social connotation.

== Machi Weyes ==
Although there is no evidence of same-sex unions amongst the Mapuche, there is evidence of homosexual men who remained unmarried and were accepted by the entire community, who could also hold the position of Machi, Mapuche shamans who were recognized as two-spirit. There is no recorded evidence of lesbianism or transvestism. Since ancient times, there were Machis called 'Weyes', who had an important social and spiritual role in the Mapuche community and were known for their certain ambiguity in their gender roles. Machi Weyes were able to vary between femininity and masculinity without being considered transgender, by incorporating elements considered feminine in a sacred connotation, including maintaining sexual relations with younger masculine men as a bottom.

However, due to the eurocentrism and religious bias of the historians who recorded these figures, it is difficult to accurately determine the practices of the shamans due to their descriptions being accompanied with derogatory terms in accordance with the Imperial Spanish moral code, which considered much of them to be demonized perversions and acts of paganism, as shown by Francisco Núñez de Pineda y Bascuñán in his book Happy Captivity:

"He seemed like the Devil in features, apparel and outfit, as he went without breeches, for this was one of those who are called hueyes. In place of his breeches, he wore a puno; that is a cloth that they carry front of them, worn from the waist down, in the fashion of the Indian women. His hair was long, where all the others went with their hair in plaits. His nails were so deformed that they looked like spoons. (He was) very small in stature, though broad-backed, and he was crippled in one leg, so that to simply lay eyes on him caused terror and astonishment." (...) "They wear chokers, rings and other womanly adornments, being much esteemed and valued by men and women, because they exercise with the latter the office of a man and with the former the office of a woman... They call them hueyes, which in our vulgar tongue means inverts, and they are held in contempt for what they will conform to."

Francisco Núñez de Pineda y Bascuñán (corrected extract from "El cautiverio feliz")

According to historian and ethnologist Tomás Guevara, young Mapuche men who engaged in homosexual acts whilst unmarried never hid the sexual acts, as they were not persecuted or punished socially or criminally for them, and was seen as something natural if practiced with a Machi Hueye. It was believed that if it was kept secret, once married the man would be punished by a higher power and their children would have severe health problems.

According to linguist Elisa Loncón, the word weye (or weyun) can be translated as 'gay' or 'homosexual man'.

== Present day ==
=== Contemporary activism ===
Mapuche visual artist and LGBTQ rights activist Seba Calfuqueo has used his work to disseminate the historical reality of homosexuality in Araunicanian culture, which was censored for centuries. In his video performance You will never be a weye (2012), he portrayed the image of a weye healer before the arrival of Spanish conquistadors to present-day Chile.

Furthermore, transgender Chilean midwife and feminist activist Claudia Ancapán Quilape has been a leading advocate for a better understanding of the ancient Mapuche worldview's gender system, contextualizing it within contemporary concepts. The documentary Claudia tocada por la luna (2018) shows her life history and the difficulties she's had due to her gender identity.

=== Same-sex Mapuche weddings ===
On 25 February 2023, the first same-sex wedding according to Mapuche religious rites was celebrated through a wefún ceremony. The rite, which recognized the union of the couple Rosa Salamanca Conalef (44) and Viviana Burgos Valenzuela (43), took place in a native forest near the town of Villa Almagro, in the municipality of Nueva Imperial, in the La Araucania region of Chile, becoming the first recognized same-sex union by the indigenous people of Chile in modern times.

== See also ==
- Epupillan
- Homosexuality and pre-Columbian rituals
- LGBTQ people in Chile
- LGBTQ people in Argentina
- Machi weye
