= Elisa Bravo =

19th-century Chilean woman

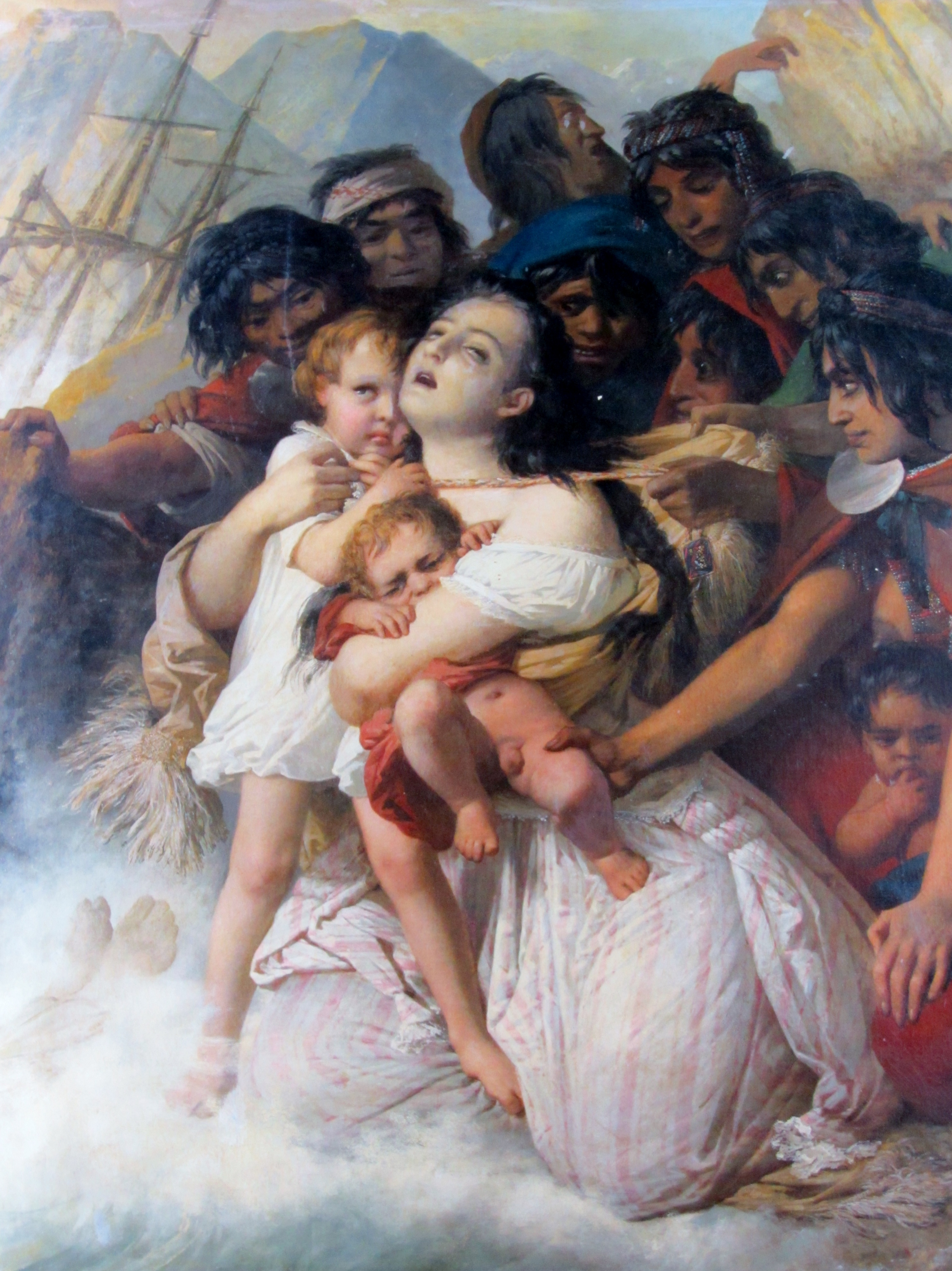
Elisa Bravo depicted on Naufragio del Joven Daniel by Raymond Monvoisin

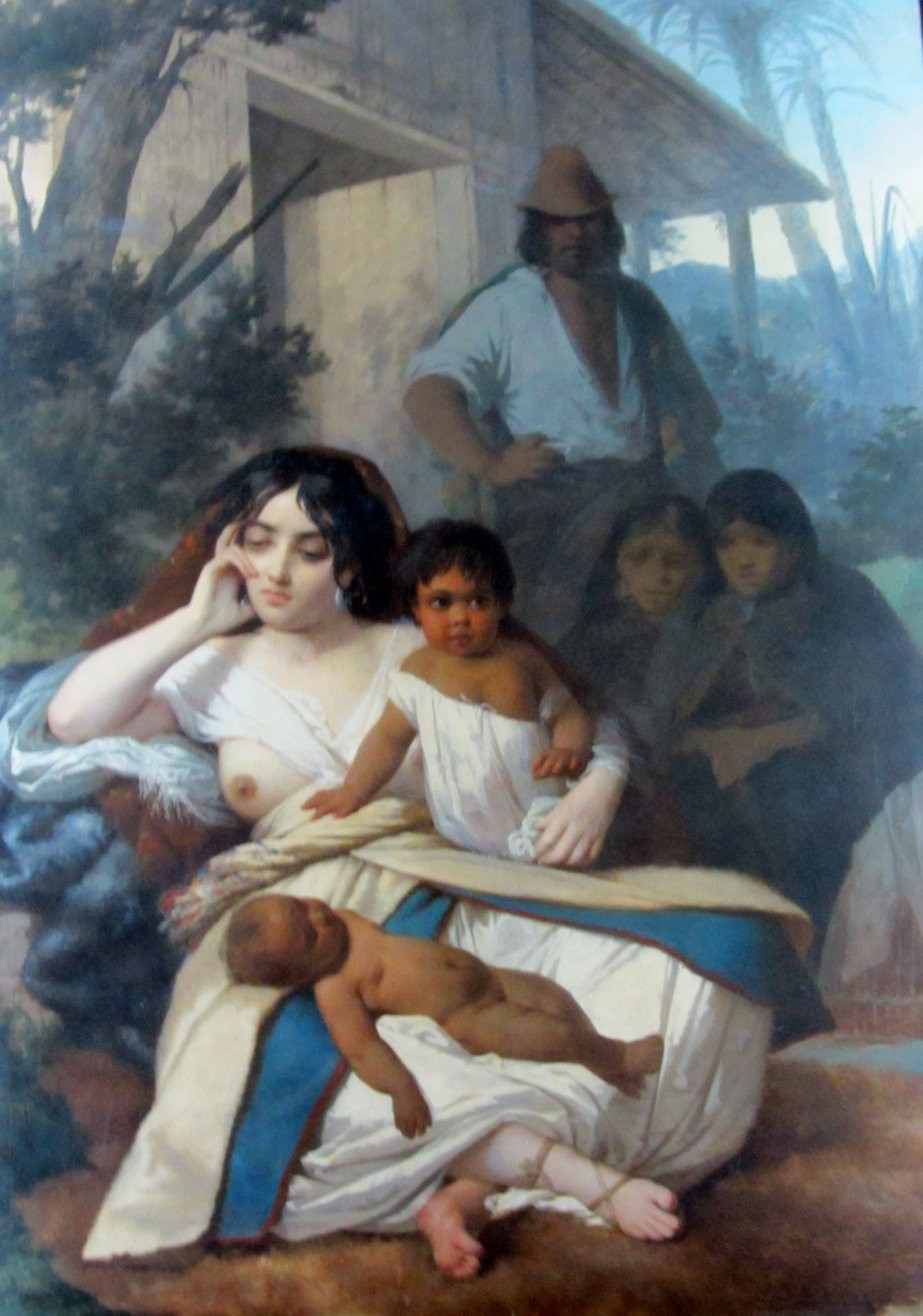
Elisa Bravo Jaramillo by Raymond Monvoisin

Elisa Bravo Jaramillo de Bañados (also spelt Eliza) was a passenger on Joven Daniel when the ship was wrecked on the coast of Araucanía, south-central Chile in 1849. She was rumoured to have survived and been held captive by local Mapuches; her supposed plight caused a stir and was even the subject of two paintings by Raymond Monvoisin.

She was born in Valdivia, Chile, the daughter of Miguel Bravo Aldunate and Carmen Jaramillo Jaramillo. She married Juan Bañados Berendique on 12 October 1846.

== The shipwreck ==
In the winter of 1849, the Chilean brig Joven Daniel was sailing on the Pacific coast of Chile from Valparaíso to Valdivia. Several passengers were on board, including trader Don Ramon Bañados, his wife Doña Elisa Bravo and a baby a few months old. The ship capsized on the coast near the Imperial River and was completely wrecked; none or only a few passengers and crew survived.

According to one version of the events, a short distance inland, the survivors found an indigenous settlement and, despite their trepidation, were welcomed by the cacique (chief) and promised protection. They responded by salvaging whatever they could from the ship as a gift for him. Unfortunately, the gift included a cask of rum, which the indigenous people proceeded to consume, after which they decided to murder the Chileans of Spanish descent by the cruellest methods. Many versions of the story conclude that no-one from the Joven Daniel survived. The findings of the commissioner of nations, José Antonio Zúñiga, concur. 20th and 21st-century historians such as Gabriel Guarda and José Bengoa have however challenged the notion that there were no survivors. As of 2010 there was no consensus among historians on what really happened.

== Stories of the fate of Elisa Bravo ==
There were various reports that Elisa Bravo may have been taken captive by the indigenous people and was still alive, living as wife to the cacique, in what is described as the most brutal forced coexistence resulting in children of "mixed blood".

Troops were sent from Valdivia to rescue her, but could not even find her body; an indigenous person told them that she was buried on the beach with her young child and her servant, with just three stones to mark the place.

Then in March 1853, a report appeared in The Times in London that Bravo had been found by a farm worker who had travelled into the interior in search of cattle. He met with a young woman whom he identified by the description she gave of herself and her parents. The piece concludes, "It is to be hoped that the long lost child will shortly be restored to her parents." However, there is no subsequent report of any such reunion.

Traveller Guillermo Cox is said to have seen Elisa Bravo in 1863.

Another report dating from 1863 said that her captors, fearing vengeance from Spaniards, sold her to the Calfucurá in Puelmapu for a hundred mares, but that she had died after three years.

== Social background and implications ==
Several aspects of the story served to reinforce prejudices of the time, and were useful in justifying policies of colonisation and the evangelisation and subjugation of indigenous peoples.

The supposed effect of alcohol on the indigenous people is described in graphic terms: "… Indians cannot resist it, and drink it […] till they get mad or helpless". Their transformation from civil welcome to diabolical murderers is presented as evidence of their uncivilised primitive barbarity, embodying the wild idea of evil.

Elisa Bravo, by contrast, presents a figure of heroic virtue, the stereotype of the virtuous woman resisting, albeit unsuccessfully, the depraved savages who immolate her companions and violate her, producing a family of mestizos (mongrels). This aspect of the story inspired Monvoisin in his two paintings of her.
