= Procesa del Carmen Sarmiento =

Argentine artist (1818–1899)

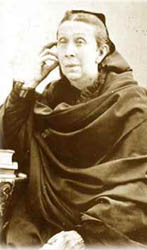
- Born: Procesa del Carmen Sarmiento; August 22, 1818; San Juan, Argentina
- Died: September 15, 1899 (aged 81); San Juan, Argentina
- Known for: Painting
- Spouse: Jean-Michel-Benjamin Lenoir

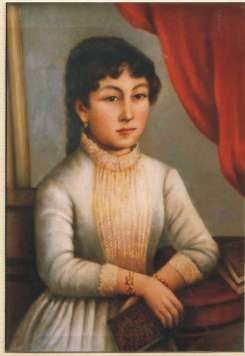
Portrait of her niece

Procesa del Carmen Sarmiento de Lenoir (August 22, 1818 – September 15, 1899) was an Argentine painter and primary school teacher.

== Bibliography ==
Procesa del Carmen Sarmiento was born in San Juan, Argentina to Paula Zoila Albarracín and José Clemente Cecilio Sarmiento. She was the youngest of fifteen children. Her brother Domingo Faustino Sarmiento, taught Procesa to read and her mother taught her to make crafts. She learned drawing and painting in San Juan from Amadeo Gras.

She taught at the College of Santa Rosa, while still taking classes in art and other specialties. Because of her opposition to the government of Juan Manuel de Rosas, Processa and her brothers Domingo and Bienvenida were forced to emigrate to Chile, where they founded a school in San Felipe de Aconcagua.

In 1843, she moved to Santiago where her brother was a journalist. She took classes with the French painter Raymond Monvoisin. In 1850, she married the engineer Jean-Michel-Benjamin Lenoir, with whom she had two daughters (Sofía and Victorina).

== Return to Argentina ==
In 1857, the family returned to San Juan and soon moved to Mendoza where Sarmiento established an art school which was attended by children of local families where they painted portraits and still life. In 1868, she returned permanently to San Juan, where in 1872, she taught painting at the High School for Girls, and in 1878, was president of the Charitable Society.

In 1882, her paintings were exhibited at the Continental Exhibition of Buenos Aires and in 1884, there was an organized exhibition in San Juan where her students exhibited their paintings. She died in 1899 in San Juan.

The "Year of Procesa Sarmiento Lenoir" was declared in 2008 in honor of her 190th birthday. Her letters are preserved in the Museum of Buenos Aires.
