= Clara Filleul =

French painter and children's writer

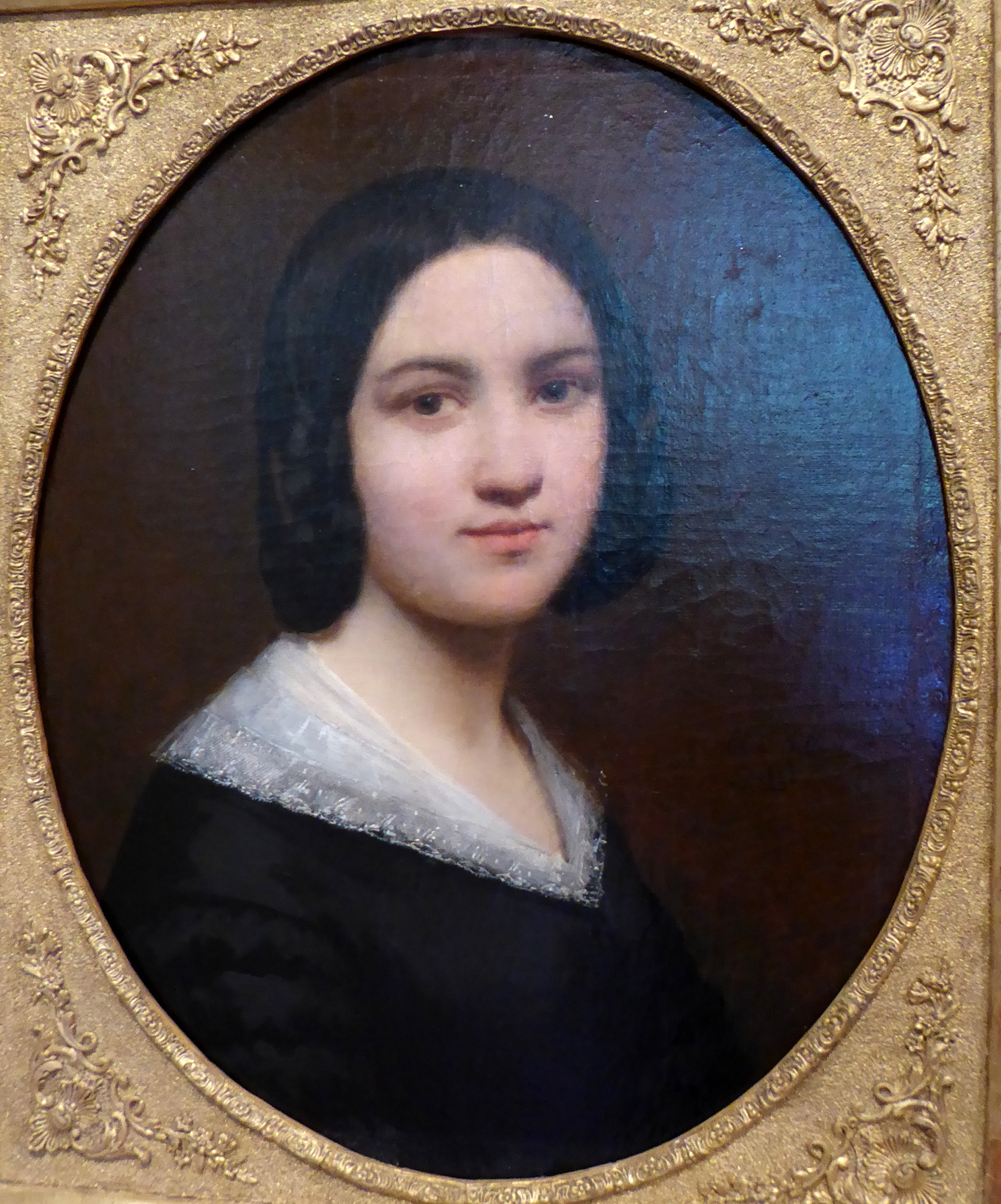
Clara Filleul, self-portrait

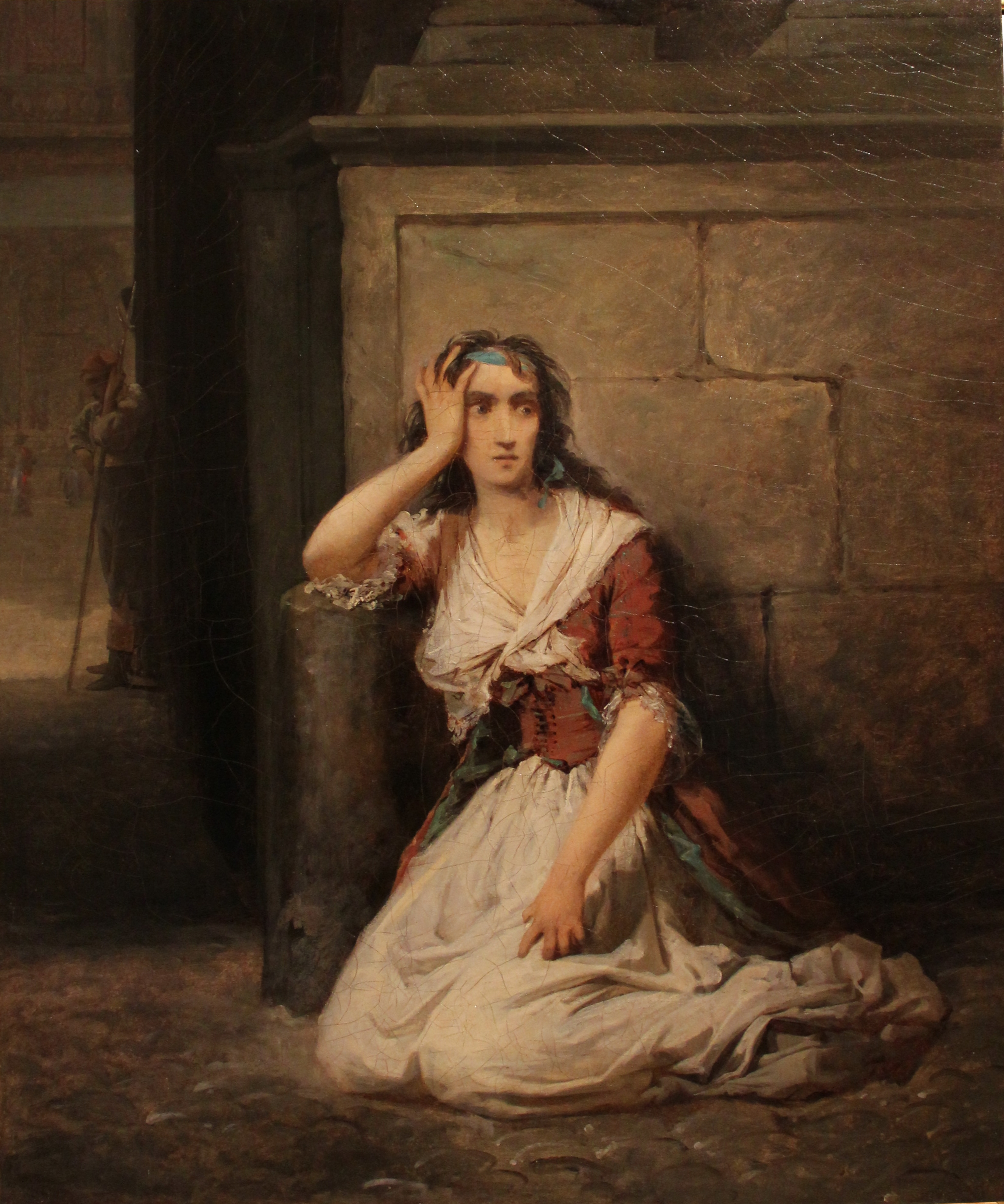
Clara Filleul: La Folle du Luxembourg (1842)

Clara Pauline Filleul, also Clara Filleul de Pétigny, (née Claire Pauline Filleul) (1822–1878) was a French painter and children's writer. Together with the painter Raymond Monvoisin she travelled to South America in the late 1840s, becoming a successful portrait painter in Santiago. On returning to France, she exhibited in the Paris Salon from 1860. As an author, from 1846 she published a number of illustrated children's stories.

== Biography ==
Born on 18 March 1833 in Nogent-le-Rotrou as Claire Pauline Filleul, she was the daughter of the lawyer François Adrien Filleul and Pauline de Pétigny de Rivery, who came from a noble Picard family.

After completing her schooling at the Institution Delfeuille in Nogent in 1835, she travelled to Palestine, Switzerland, Italy, Egypt and Algeria, publishing illustrated accounts of her travels. She then studied drawing, painting and lithography under Raymond Auguste Monvoisin and exhibited her first painting at the Paris Salon of 1842. From 1842, she accompanied Monvoisin on journeys to South America for stays in Peru, Chile and Brazil.

In 1848, together with Monvoisin, she arrived in Santiago where they opened a studio. Over the next 10 years, Filleul became one of the principal painters in Chile, with notable works such as Una guasa (c.1855). She also coloured photographs in Victor Deroche's studio. She also taught art in Santiago and was awarded a medal for her portraits.

On returning to France in 1860, she again exhibited at the Salon. While her pastel paintings of baskets of fruit were highly acclaimed, she also created portraits in oils and gave painting lessons. Several of her books were reprinted, including Récits au coin du feu and La Palestine.

Clara Filleul died in Paris on 7 August 1878 but was buried in Nogent-le-Rotrou.
