= Capitán de amigos =

In colonial and early republican Chile capitán de amigos (lit. captain of friends) were Spanish and Mestizo officials who surveilled friendly indigenous tribes (Spanish: indios amigos). Capitanes de amigos were oversighted by higher-ranking officials known as comisario de naciones. It was not uncommon for a capitán de amigos to live among the indigenous peoples he was in charge of, sometimes marrying indigenous women and even adopting prohibited customs such as Mapuche polygamy. Knowing both Spanish and indigenous cultures some capitanes de amigos took advantage of this to profit in frontier trade. In times of indigenous revolts information provided by capitanes de amigos was crucial for Spanish and Chilean authorities.
