= Comisario de naciones =

In colonial and early republican Chile comisario de naciones was a government official that mediated between indigenous and the Spanish Crown, later authorities of the Republic of Chile replaced the Spanish in the mediation chain. The comisario de naciones would hear the concerns of local caciques and bring the issues to relevant authorities. Each comisario de naciones was charged with the oversight of various capitanes de amigos. Invitations to the parliaments held between the Governor of Chile and indigenous authorities were granted by comisarios de naciones.

In the mid-19th century the functions of the comisario de naciones begun to be overtaken by ordinary judges. This put Huilliche of Futahuillimapu in great disadvantage as their lands were coveted by non-indigenous Chileans and German settlers and the ordinary judges had scant knowledge of indigenous properties and rights.
