= Pascual Coña =

Mapuche man who shared his people's customs

Pascual Coña (late 1840s – October 28, 1927) was a Mapuche landowner from the region of Budi Lake, Chile, who narrated in Mapudungun the story of his life and the Mapuche customs of the time to the German Capuchin missionary Ernesto Wilhelm de Moesbach.

Moesbach and Coña's conversations stretched over the course of four years. In the long Chilean winters, Moesbach would go to Coña's house and write down dictation from Coña, or document the conversations the two had. The final product was the bilingual book Vida y costumbres de los indígenas araucanos en la segunda mitad del siglo XIX ("Life and Customs of the Indigenous Araucanians in the Second Half of the 19th Century"), a text that narrates not only Coña's life but also the customs of the Mapuche, for which it is considered a very important source for the study of the Mapuche people and their language in the 19th century.

== Biography ==
What is known of Pascual Coña's life comes almost entirely from his own telling and Moesbach's notes that accompany it.

His father was named Tomás Coña, he was the son of Ayllapang, and he had been born in Rauquenhue (now Piedra Alta, west of Budi Lake), while his mother, Juana, was the daughter of Payllaw and Wenter and was born in Huapi (an island in Budi Lake). Their home region was in the area of present-day Puerto Saavedra, in the northern coastal area of Araucanía. Tomás Coña and Juana were not Christian, and they were married in the Mapuche tradition; they had several children, the first of which was Pascual. Others of his siblings were named Felipe, María, Carmelita, Fidel, and Juana.

Pascual Coña was educated at the Budi Catholic mission and later studied carpentry in Santiago, but he had to leave and return to his home because his father believed him to be dead after receiving a photograph of him in the mail. During the occupation of Araucanía, Coña collaborated with the Chilean troops, on the orders of his lonko, Pascual Painemilla. He later traveled to Argentina and attended an interview with President Julio Roca.

Coña was married twice. His first wife died, and his second wife left him.

After losing his lands to a Chilean settler, he was sent elsewhere and given the title "chief of reduction." That is why some authors have considered him a cacique, and he has been referred to as such in the title of his memoirs since the 1970s: Lonco Pascual Cona ñi tuculpazungun - testimonio de un cacique mapuche.
