= Raymond Monvoisin =

French painter (1790–1870)

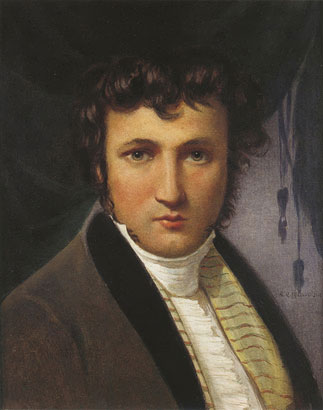
- Self-portrait, 19th century
- Born: 31 May 1790; Bordeaux, France
- Died: 26 March 1870 (aged 79); Boulogne-sur-Mer, France
- Education: École des Beaux-Arts
- Awards: Legion of Honour

Raymond Auguste Quinsac Monvoisin (31 May 1790 – 26 March 1870) was a French artist and painter.

== Biography ==
Monvoisin was born on 31 May 1790 in Bordeaux. Although he initiated a career in the military by indication of his father, at the age of eighteen Monvoisin fully dedicated himself to painting.

Settling in Paris, Monvoisin studied at the École des Beaux-Arts and at the atelier of Pierre-Narcisse Guérin. His work soon earned him the support of the critics and achieved commercial success. He was hired by merchants, bankers and other members of the newly emerging middle-class. In 1819 he carried out his first exposition in the Museum of the Louvre. Exhibiting at the 1820 Prix de Rome, Monvoisin was awarded the second prize and scholarship to study in Rome at the Villa Medici. Monvoisin remained in Rome until 1825.

Interested in the opportunities in the newly independent Americas, Monvoisin travelled to Argentina and from there to Chile. He received an official invitation from the Chilean government to direct the Academy of Painting which was officially created on March 17, 1848. With almost no funds, he arrived at Santiago. Preceded by his fame, he was introduced to the high-class families of the capital and, in turn, to work as a successful portrait painter. His works had a decisive influence in the new Chilean society, which acquired the inclinations of European fashion, especially French.

He dedicated his efforts to many different activities during his stay in Chile. He traveled through the country, invested in mines, and created a ranching estate. His first years as a drawing professor in Paris helped in forming notable artists of the time like Francisco Mandiola and Procesa Sarmiento. Along with French painter Clara Filleul, he mobilized the pictorial art in Chile and Argentina. He was elevated to a Knight of the Legion of Honour in 1857, and returned to France in 1858, but his fame had vanished.

On 26 March 1870, Monvoisin died in Boulogne-sur-Mer in poverty.

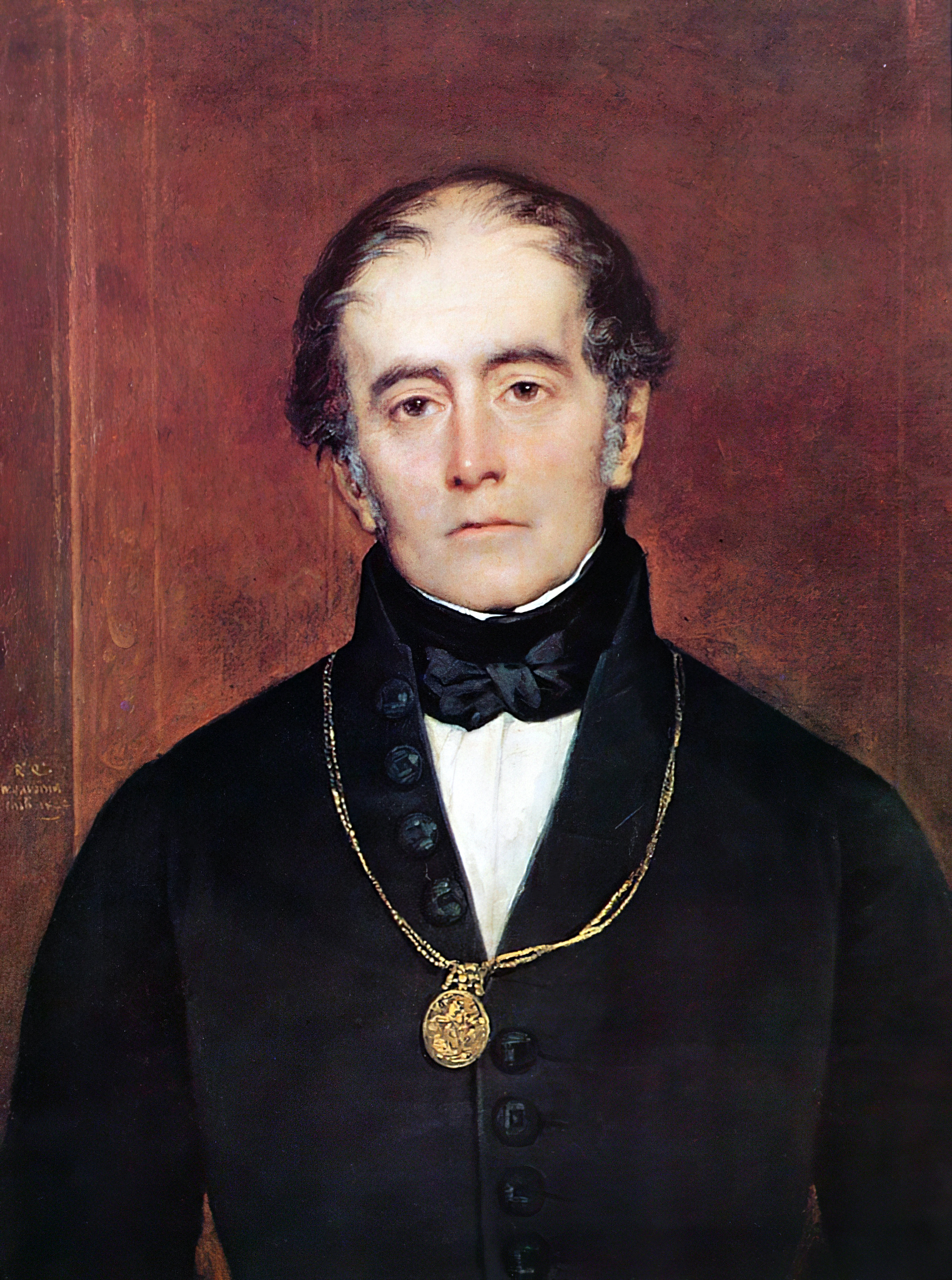
Portrait of Andrés Bello

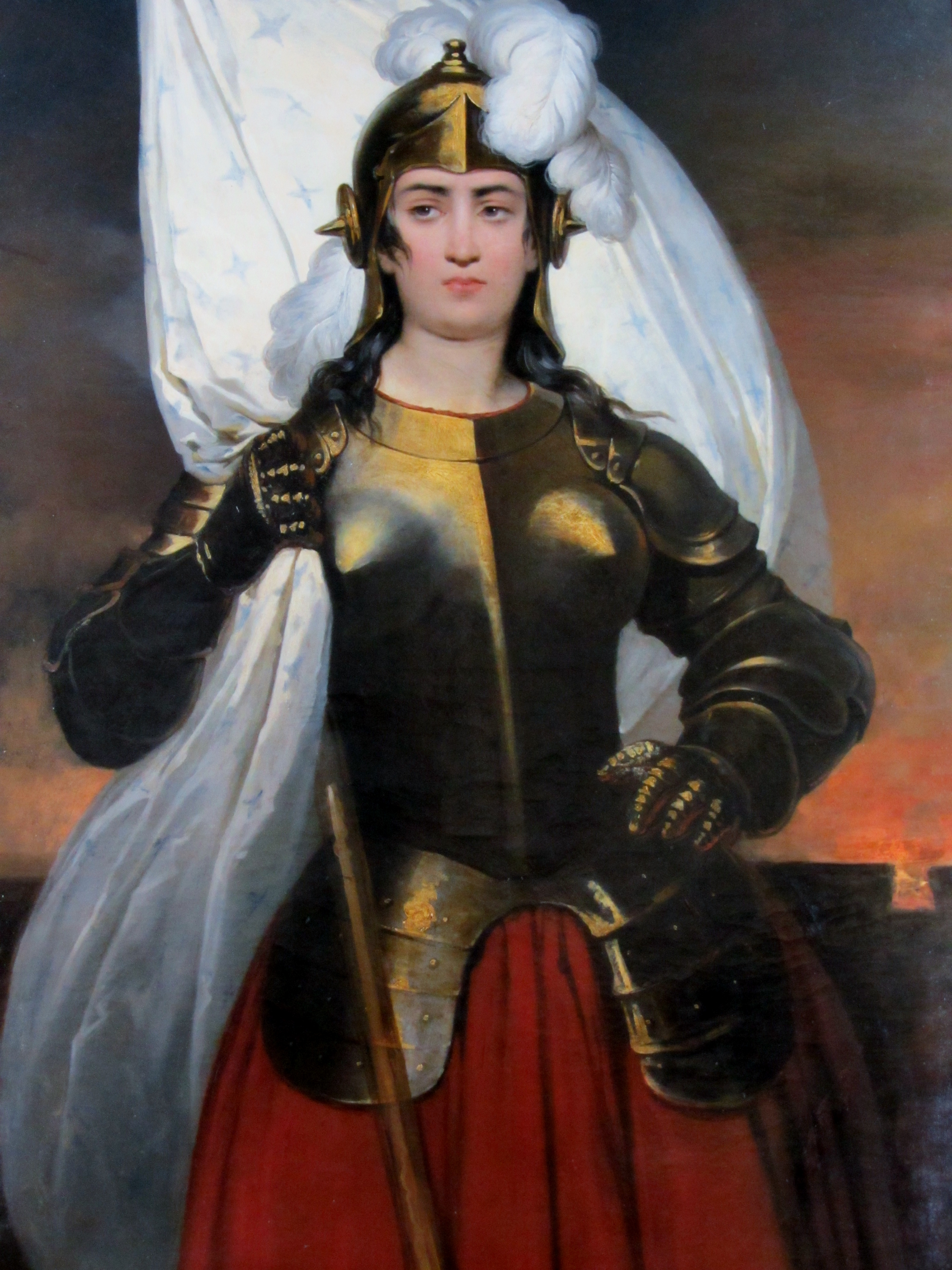
Jeanne d'Arc, 1843

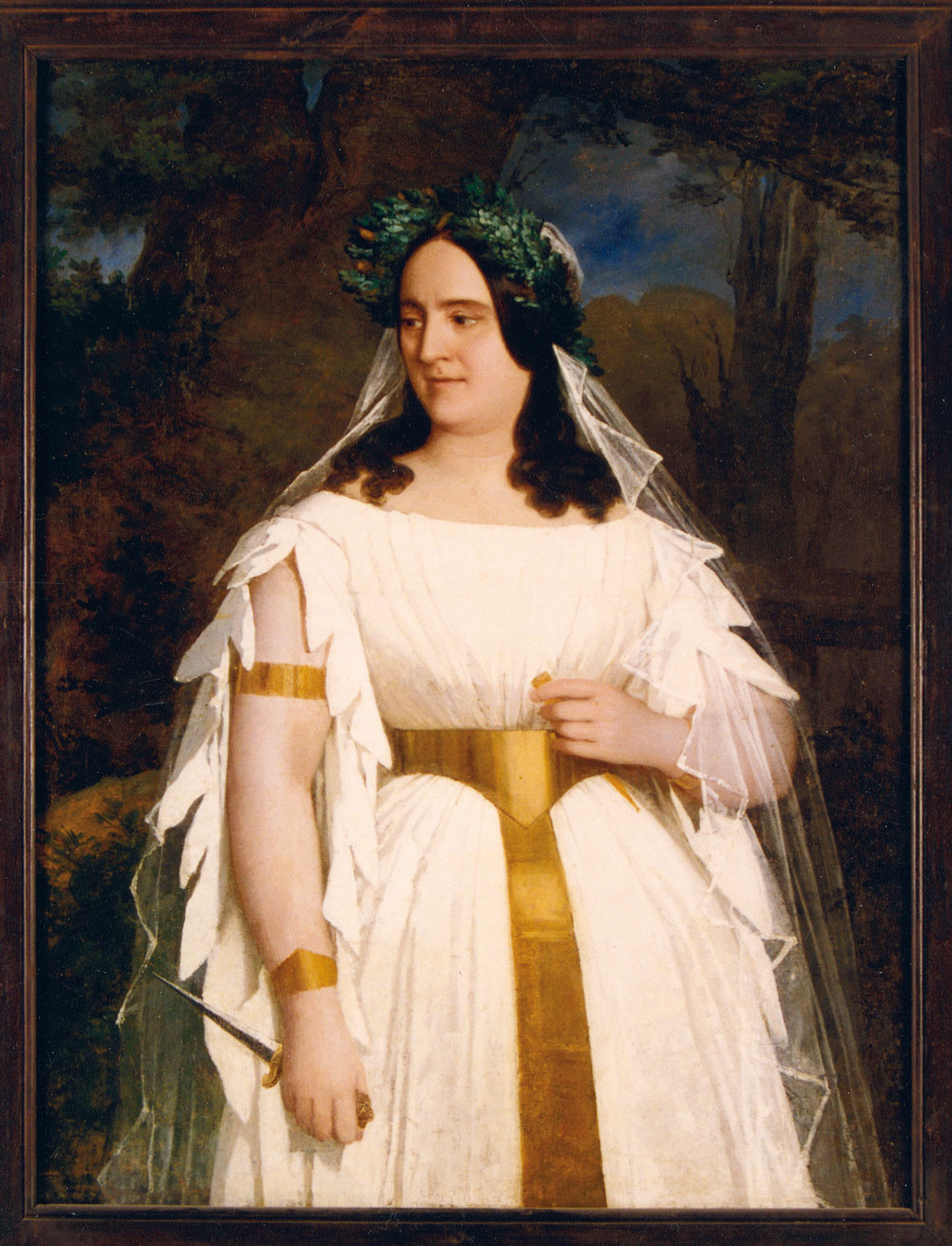
Adelaida Corradi de Pantanelli como Norma, 1845

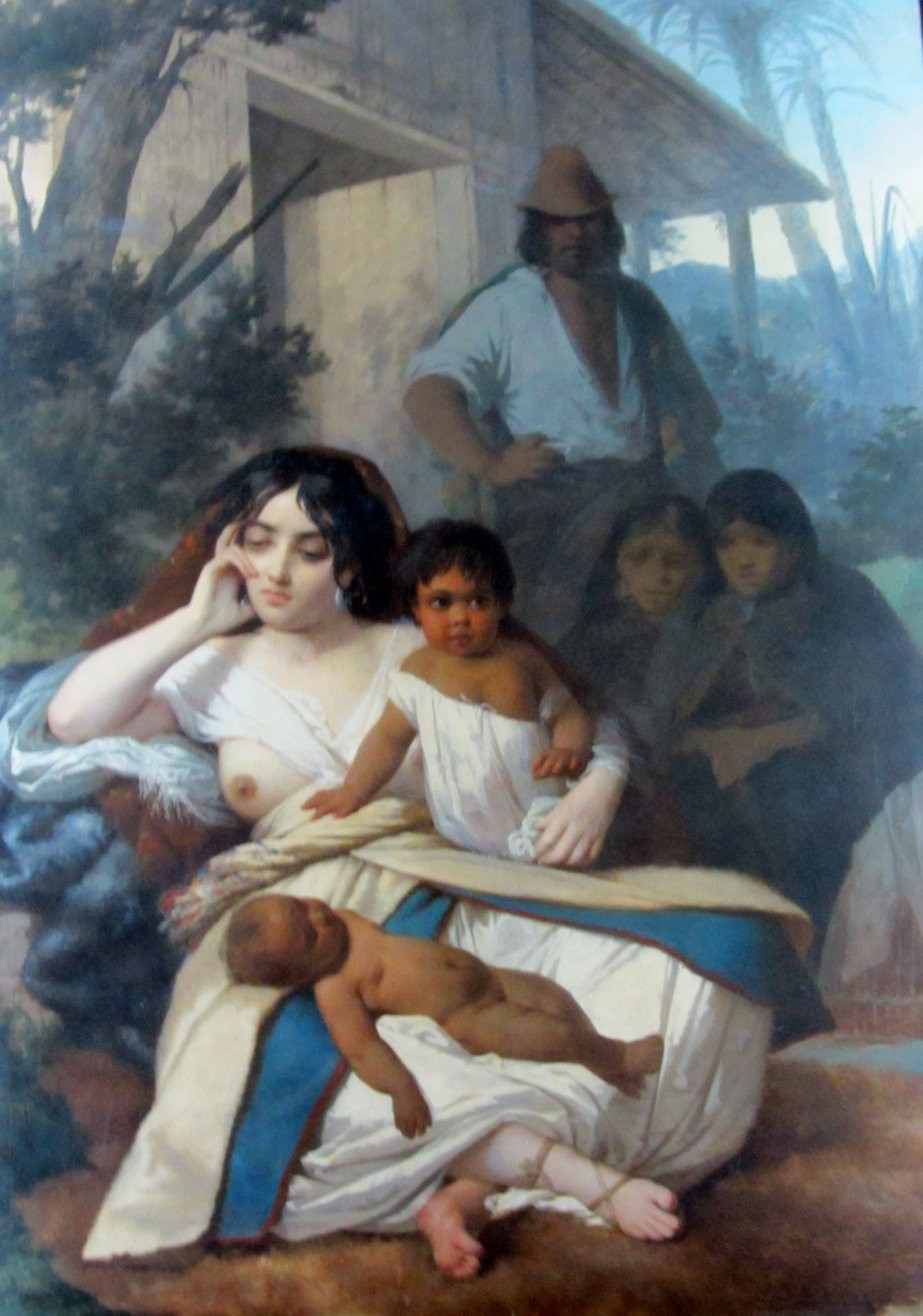
Elisa Bravo Jaramillo de Bañados, mujer del cacique (Elisa Bravo en cautiverio), 1858

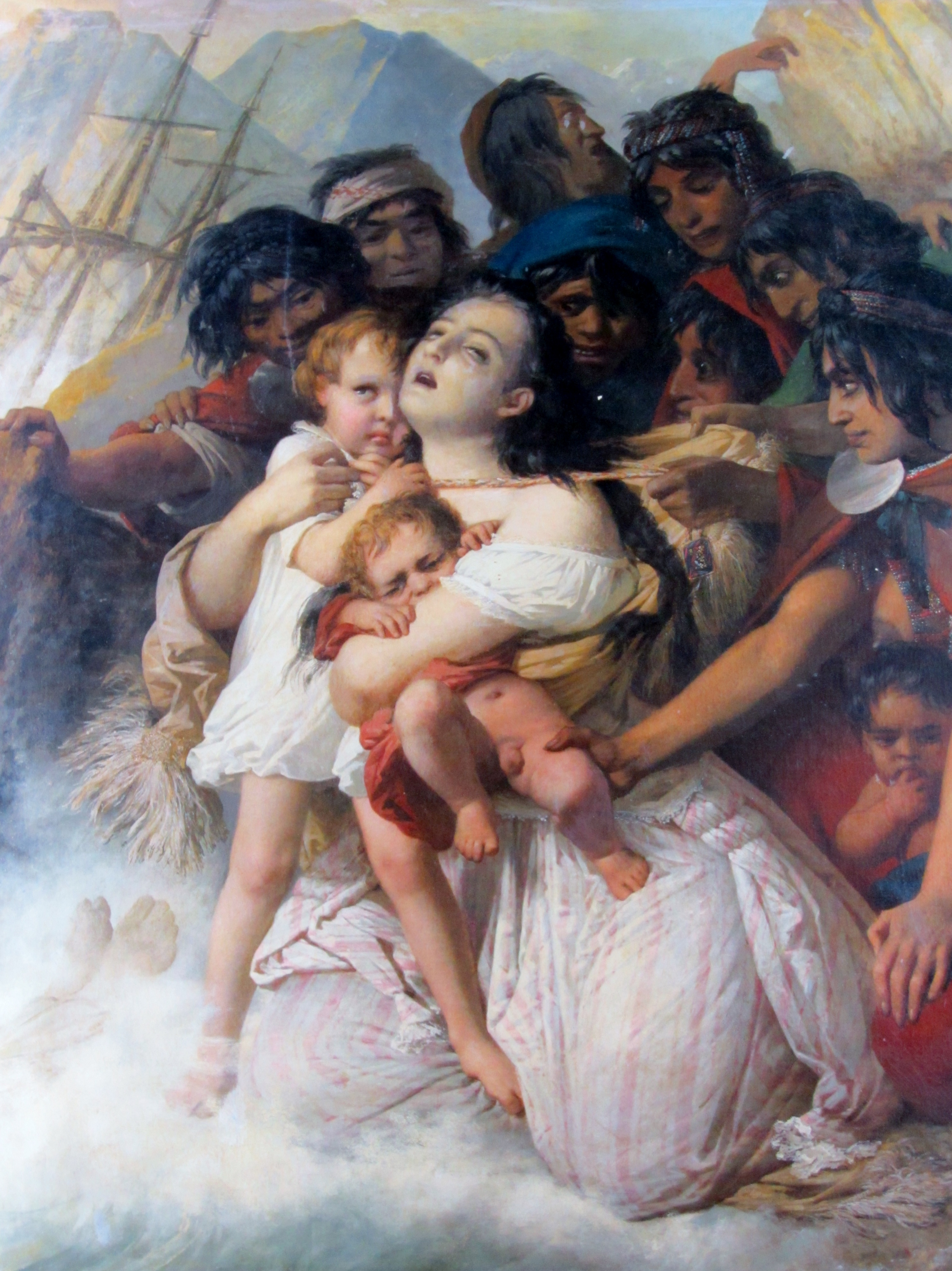
Shipwreck of the Young Daniel, 1859
