= Tomás Guevara =

Chilean historian

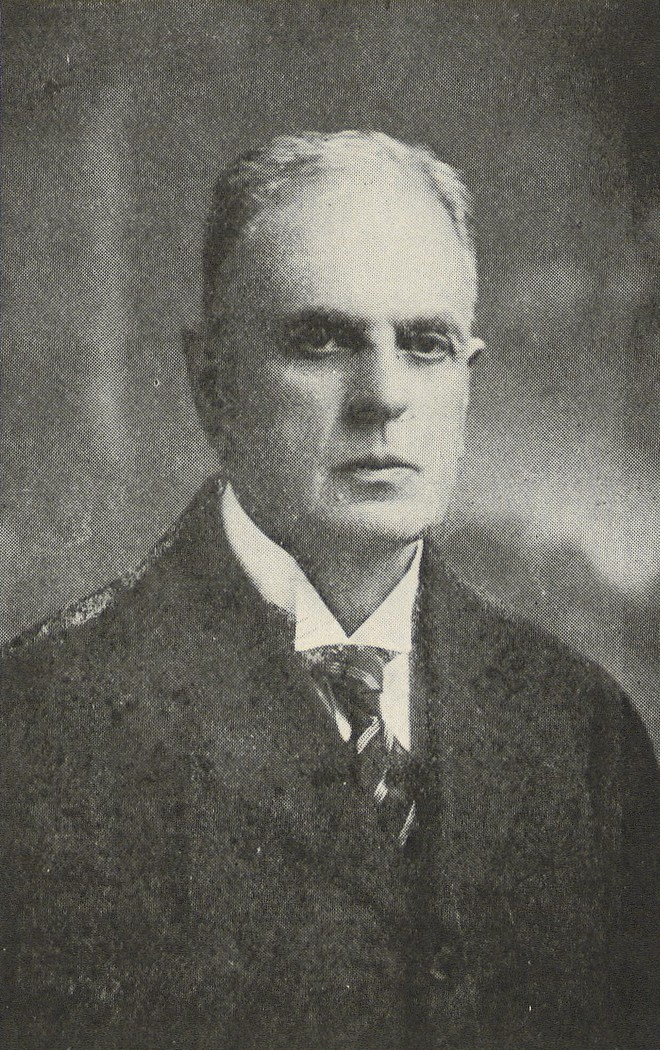
- Born: 1865; Curicó, Chile
- Died: 1935 (aged 69–70)
- Occupation: Historian

Tomás Guevara Silva (1865–1935) was a Chilean historian, teacher, War of the Pacific veteran and a prominent scholar of the Mapuche people. He was born in Curicó.

== Bibliography ==
- Historia de Curicó (1890)
- La etnolojía araucana en el poema de Ercilla
