= Budi Lake =

Lake in southern Chile

- Lago Budi (Spanish)
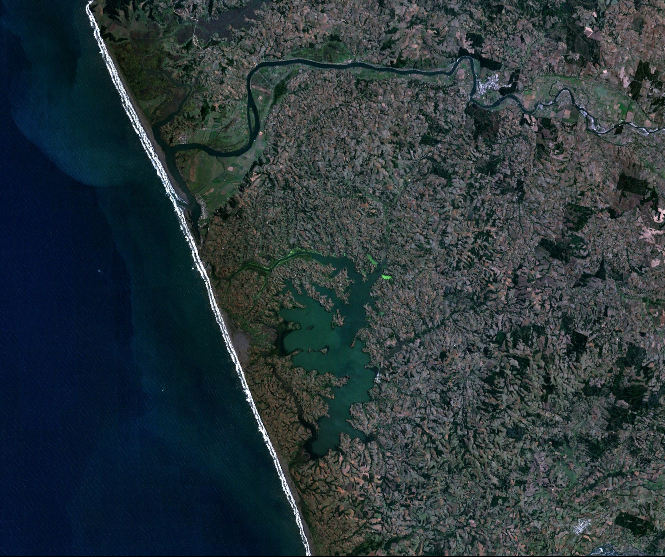

- Location within Chile
- Interactive map of Budi Lake
- Coordinates: 38°53′S 73°17′W
- Primary inflows: Estero Comoe, Estero Boyeco
- Primary outflows: Budi River
- Basin countries: Chile
- Surface area: 56.2 km^{2} (21.7 sq mi)
- Max. depth: 10.5 m (34 ft)
- Shore length^{1}: approx. 105 km (65 mi)
- Surface elevation: 2 m (6 ft 7 in)
- Settlements: Puerto Domínguez
- ^{1} Shore length is not a well-defined measure.

Budi Lake (Spanish: Lago Budi, Spanish: [ˈbuði]) from the Mapudungun word Füzi which means salt, is a tidal brackish water lake located near the coast of La Araucanía Region, southern Chile. The lake is part of the boundaries between Saavedra and Teodoro Schmidt commune.

Budi Lake is among the few lakes of the west coast of the Americas that have seasonal inflows of sea water. Another difference to many Chilean lakes is that Budi Lake is not of glacial origin and does not lie in the Andes mountain range. Budi Lake is above a coastal plain just south of Nahuelbuta Range and north of the Valdivian Coastal Range where the Chilean Coast Range is very low.

The lake was formed by tectonic movements and eustatic sea level changes.

According to the census of 2002, the zone around the lake is one of the poorest parts of La Araucanía Region, Chile's poorest region in turn. The 13,275 persons who live around the lake form 3,087 families with 30 years as average age. 40% of the population is under 18 years old and 73.2% declare to be Mapuches.

The seashore near the lake was the site of the infamous 1849 wreck of Joven Daniel.
