= Happy Captivity =

Novel by Francisco Núñez de Pineda y Bascuñán

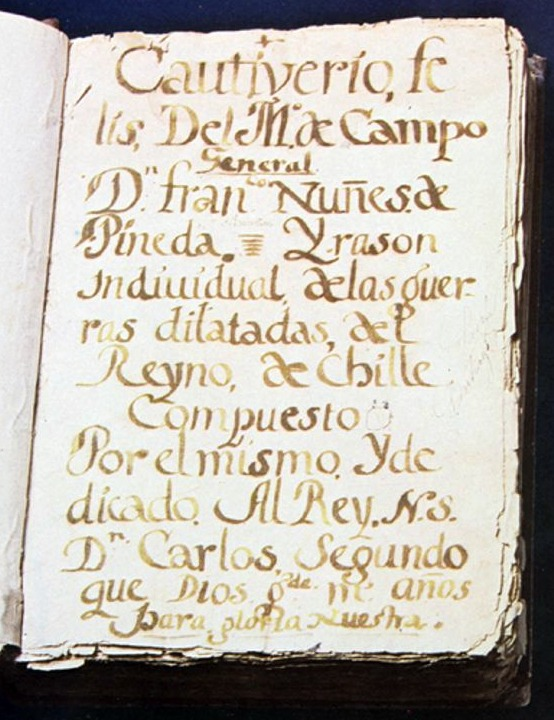
- Original cover from 1673.
- Author: Francisco Núñez de Pineda y Bascuñán
- Genre: Chronicle, travel log
- Publication date: 1863

Happy Captivity and Reason for the Prolonged Wars of the Kingdom of Chile (Cautiverio feliz y razón individual de las guerras dilatadas del reino de Chile), better known as simply Happy Captivity (Cautiverio Feliz) is a captivity narrative written in 1673 by Chilean Spaniard Francisco Núñez de Pineda y Bascuñán, which narrates his experiences as a captive war soldier in 1629 at the hands of Mapuche warriors during the War of Arauco. This novel, which shows the contrasts between the two cultures, constitutes an important testimony in the intercultural relations and Indigenous customs of the 17th century. Originally dedicated to King Charles II of Spain, it was republished in Santiago de Chile in 1863.

== Content ==
During his "happy captivity", Pineda y Bascuñán learned about the customs, festivals, games, drunkenness, war systems, industry, political organization and domestic life of the Mapuche. From his descriptions, it can be noted that the writer felt very comfortable living with them and that is where the title of the book derives from. In his words: "the Indians [...], although barbarians, know how to be human and grateful." All of these autobiographical stories about the Mapuche society of that time had a historiographical approach attached to the idiosyncrasies and morals of the Spanish Empire in colonial Chile, which in turn was closely related to the Catholic Church, which is why it included some subjective adjectives to refer to certain practices of the indigenous people, a product of cultural shock, which today are in disuse for these purposes, seen from the European worldview of the 17th century.

For example, it is one of the first documents that describe sexual morality in the Mapuche community, such as the chastity of warriors prior to combat, the polygamy of certain castes of power and influence, and homosexuality in Mapuche culture, with the existence of a type of machi called weye, a homosexual male respected as a spiritual and medical authority by the entire tribe. Although he berates these activities, the author repeatedly states as a complaint about the vices and humiliations committed by the Spanish conquerors in said territories, thus presenting an antinomy that attempts to demonstrate that contrary to what was believed, the Mapuche people did have principles and values with a clearly defined social order, in contrast to the acts committed by the Spanish, who claimed to represent the moral values of "civilization".

== Cultural references ==
In Chile, multiple plays and films have been made based on this work. The first film adaptation was directed by Cristián Sánchez and released in 1998, including various segments spoken in the Indigenous language of Mapudungun and starring a mostly-Mapuche cast of Lorenzo Aillapán, Juan Pablo Aliaga, Mario Mila, Armando Nahuelpán and Eusebio Painemal.
