= Francisco Núñez de Pineda y Bascuñán =

Chilean writer

Francisco Núñez de Pineda y Bascuñán (1607–1682) was a Chilean writer and soldier.

He was born in Chillán Viejo, Biobío Region, Chile. In 1629 he participated in an expedition to defeat the Mapuche, but, during the Battle of Las Cangrejeras, he was taken prisoner by the cacique Maulicán, who kept him captive for seven months. After being released, he rose through the ranks to become commander of the fort of Boroa in 1654, and he was eventually appointed maestre de campo in 1656 by Governor of Chile Pedro Porter Casanate and had an important role in the Spanish victory in Conuco and the relief of the fort of Boroa. From his experiences among the Mapuches, he wrote in 1673, the chronicle Cautiverio feliz y razón individual de las guerras dilatadas del reino de Chile (Happy Captivity and Reason for the Prolonged Wars of the Kingdom of Chile), which constitutes one of the most important and realistic descriptions of the customs of the Mapuche people, as well as containing a defense of their rights. This helped later when Spaniards tried to get along with Mapuche.

== Sources ==
- José Toribio Medina, Diccionario biográfico colonial de Chile, Impr. Elziviriana, Santiago, 1906 Pg. 577–586.
- Francisco Núñez de Pineda y Bascuñán, Cautiverio feliz, y autiverio feliz, y razón de las guerras dilatadas de Chile, Coleccíon de historiadores de Chile y documentos relativos a la historia nacional, Tomo III, Sociedad Chilena de Historia y Geografía, Instituto Chileno de Cultura Hispánica, Academia Chilena de la Historia, Imprenta del Ferrocarril, Santiago, 1863. Original from Harvard University, Digitized May 19, 2007.
