= 1851 in Chile =

- Decades: 1830s; 1840s; 1850s; 1860s; 1870s
- See also: Other events of 1851; Timeline of Chilean history

Events in the year 1851 in Chile.

== Incumbents ==
- President: Manuel Bulnes until September 18, Manuel Montt

== Events ==
- Chilean presidential election, 1851
- April 20-December 31 - 1851 Chilean Revolution (also known as Revolution of 1851)
- November 19 - Revolution of 1851: Combat of Monte de Urra
- November 21 - Mutiny of Cambiazo
- December 8 - Battle of Loncomilla

== Births ==
- 6 February – Policarpo Toro (died 1921)
- date unknown – Juana Roldán

== Deaths ==
- April 20 - Pedro Urriola Balbontín
- 9 December - Ramón Freire (born 1851)
