= Boonen =

Boonen is a surname. Notable people with the surname include:

- Arnold Boonen (1669–1729), Dutch painter
- Jacobus Boonen (1573–1655), Belgian bishop
- Jan Boonen (born 1940), Belgian racing cyclist
- Jorge Boonen (1858–1921), Chilean military officer
- Indy Boonen (born 1999), Belgian footballer
- Tom Boonen (born 1980), Belgian road bicycle racer
