= 1855 in Chile =

- Decades: 1830s; 1840s; 1850s; 1860s; 1870s
- See also: Other events of 1855; Timeline of Chilean history

The following lists events that happened during 1855 in Chile.

== Incumbents ==
President of Chile: Manuel Montt

== Events ==
=== December ===
- 14 December - The Chilean Civil Code is passed into law by the Chilean Congress.
- 22 December - The newspaper El Ferrocarril is established.

== Births ==
- 27 February - Roberto Silva Renard (died 1920)

== Deaths ==
- 29 December - Buenaventura Cousiño Jorquera (born 1855)
