= 1848 in Chile =

- Decades: 1820s; 1830s; 1840s; 1850s; 1860s
- See also: Other events of 1848; Timeline of Chilean history

Events in the year 1848 in Chile.

== Incumbents ==
- President: Manuel Bulnes

== Events ==
=== February ===
- 8 February - The Treaty of Lima is signed.

== Births ==
- date unknown - Francisco de Borja Echeverría (died 1904)
- 5 February - Ignacio Carrera Pinto (died 1882)
- April 3 - Arturo Prat (died 1879)
- November 16 - Rafael Sotomayor Gaete (died 1918)

== Deaths ==
- 17 December - José María Urrutia Manzano (born 1771)
