= 1858 in Chile =

- Decades: 1830s; 1840s; 1850s; 1860s; 1870s
- See also: Other events of 1858; Timeline of Chilean history

The following lists events that happened during 1858 in Chile.

== Incumbents ==
- President of Chile: Manuel Montt

== Births ==
- 16 April - Jorge Boonen (d. 1921)
- 27 December - Juan Luis Sanfuentes (d. 1930)

== Deaths ==
- 18 July - Francisco Antonio Pinto (b. 1785)
