= 1853 in Chile =

- Decades: 1830s; 1840s; 1850s; 1860s; 1870s
- See also: Other events of 1853; Timeline of Chilean history

The following lists events that happened during 1853 in Chile.

== Incumbents ==
President of Chile: Manuel Montt

== Events ==
- date unknown - The first Chilean postage stamps are issued.

== Births ==
- 25 September - Juan Francisco González (died 1933)

== Deaths ==
- December - Nicolás Rodríguez Peña (born 1775)
