= 1850 in Chile =

- Decades: 1830s; 1840s; 1850s; 1860s; 1870s
- See also: Other events of 1850; Timeline of Chilean history

The following lists events that happened during 1850 in Chile.

== Incumbents ==
President of Chile: Manuel Bulnes

== Births ==
- date unknown - Daniel Ortúzar (died 1932)
- 5 April - Ismael Tocornal (died 1929)
- 23 August - José Rafael Balmaceda (died 1911)
- 20 October - Sofanor Parra (died 1925)
- 16 November - Federico Errázuriz Echaurren (died 1901)
