= MG 01 =

German machine gun produced before WWI

Maschinengewehr 1901
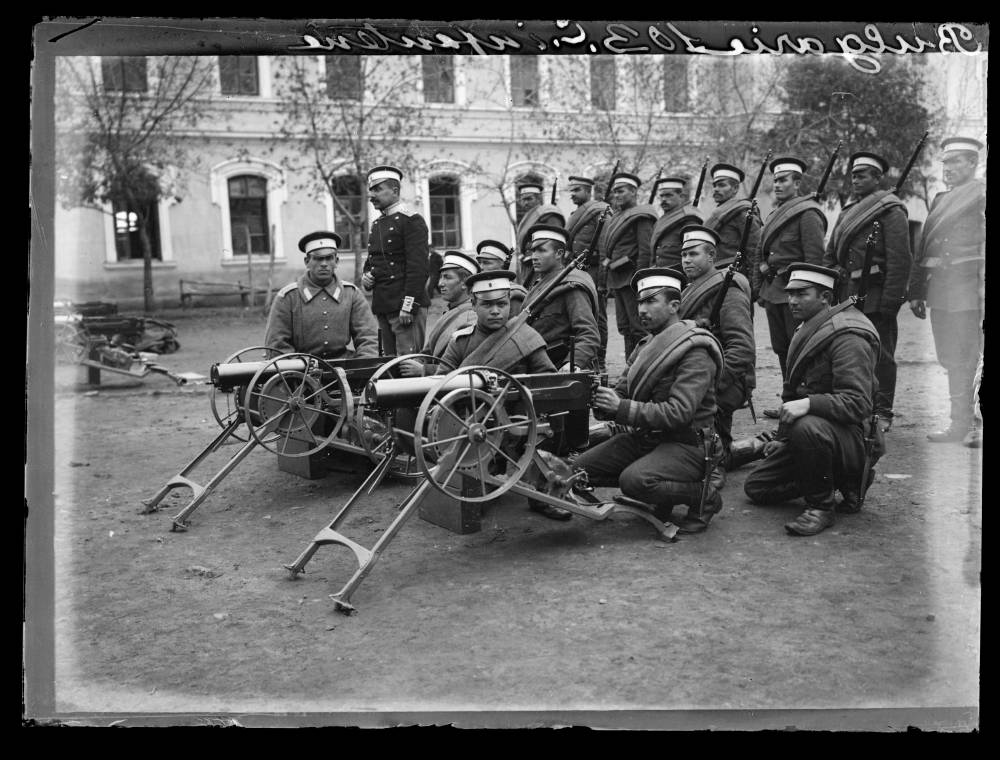
- Bulgarian infantry with two MG 01s mounted with wheels, 1908.
- Type: Heavy machine gun

Service history
- In service: 1901-1919
- Wars: Herero Wars; World War I Spartacist uprising Balkan Wars

Production history
- Designer: Deutsche Waffen und Munitionsfabriken
- Manufacturer: DWM
- No. built: At least 400 (1914)

The Maschinengewehr 1901, or MG 01, was the standard machine gun of the Imperial German Army from its introduction in 1901 to the adoption of its successor, the MG 08, in 1908. After the introduction of the MG 08, the MG 01 was mainly used by German colonial soldiers.

== History ==
=== Adoption and development ===
In Navy Gazette of October 3, 1892, Kaiser Wilhelm II approved a supreme cabinet order allowing the introduction of the "8-mm Maxim machine gun into the naval artillery" for cruisers and landing parties, leading to the development and adoption of the MG 99, which was based on the M87 "World Standard" by the army in 1899. An application for a UK patent on the sled carriage was filed by Deutsche Waffen- und Munitionsfabriken in 1900. The MG 01 added upon the MG 99 by introducing spoked wheels to the sled mount on some models which allowed it to be pushed and pulled.

=== Service history ===
The MG 01 was first used in the Herero Wars by the German Empire against the Herero and Nama peoples. Afterwards, at least two MG 01s were exported to Bulgaria where they saw service in the Balkan Wars. By the start of World War I, almost all of the MG 01s and other machine guns considered obsolete had been relegated to machine gun detachments in Germany's colonial possessions where they had started to be replaced by the MG 08. During World War I, it was used by the East and South West African Schutztruppe where it was commonly mounted on tripods and artillery carriages. In the Kiautschou Bay Leased Territory, it was used by the machine gun company of the III. Seebataillon and saw service during the Siege of Tsingtao. After World War I, the MG 01 was used by German soldiers during the Spartacist uprising.

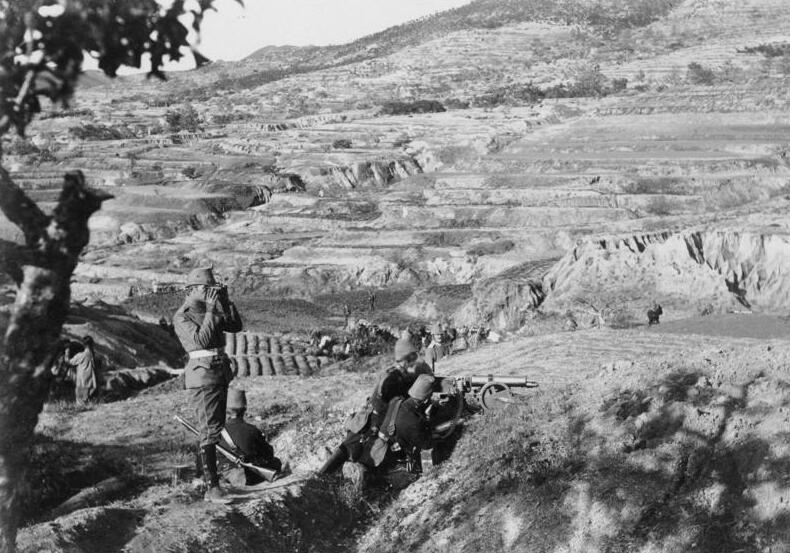
Machine gun detachment of the III. Seebataillon in the Mt. Bismark battery in Tsingtao with an MG 01, 1914.

== Surviving examples ==
There are only 2 known surviving examples of the MG 01. The first is MG 01 No. 206 which was produced in 1902, located in the Bayerisches Armeemuseum in Ingolstadt, Bavaria, it belonged to the III. Bataillon 3. Infanterie Regiment, 1. Maschinengewehr Abteilung, located in Augsburg, Bavaria. The second is MG 01 No. 626 which was produced in 1907 in Berlin, located in the Royal Museum of the Armed Forces and Military History in Brussels, Belgium, it was most likely one of the MG 01s delivered to the navy. Later, during World War I, it was captured by the British Empire.

== Users ==
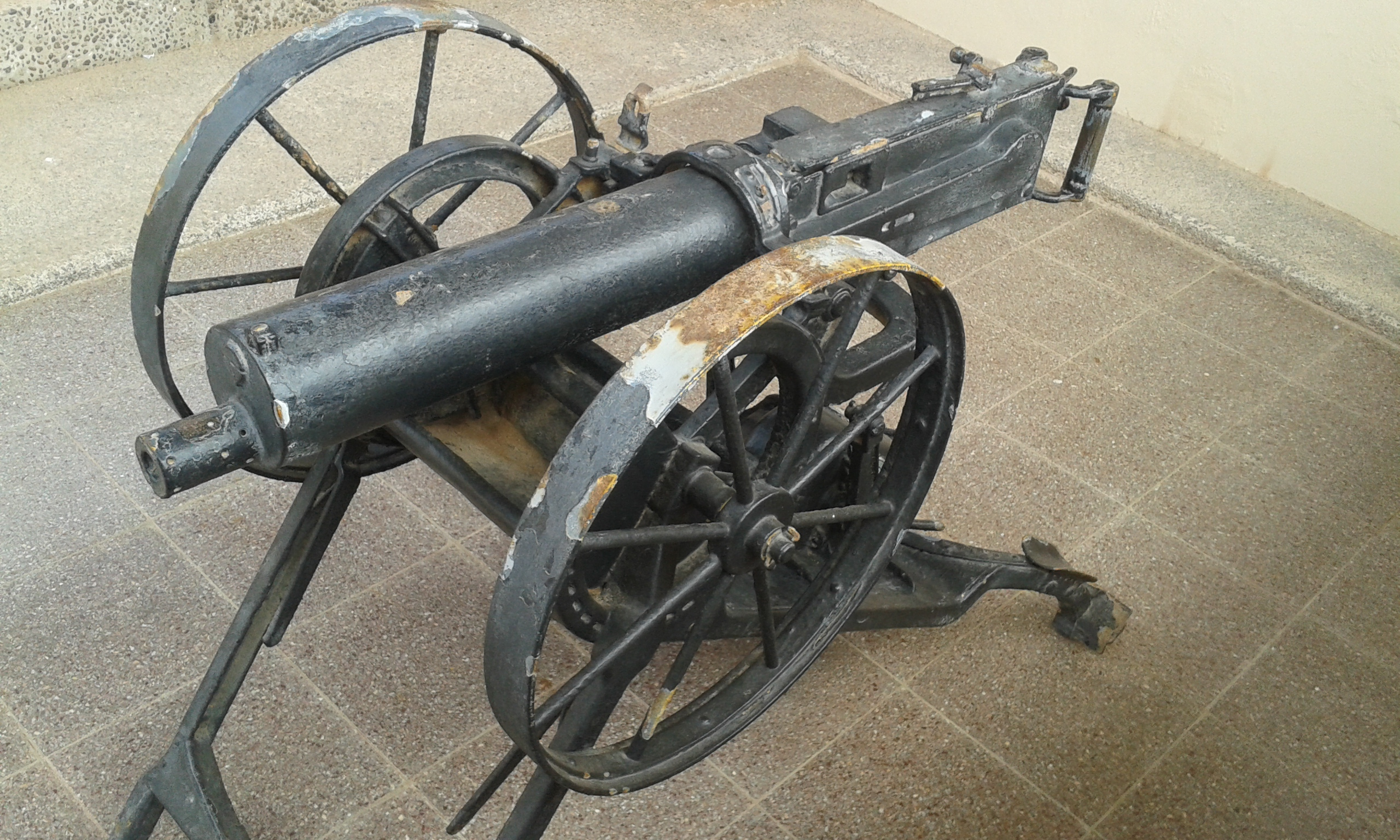
Chilean M1902 Maxim was essentially identical to MG 01 except for the caliber

- German Empire: used by the Kaiserliche Marine and Deutsches Heer from 1901 until a at least 1919.
- Chile: despite a cheaper Hotchkiss machine gun already in service, adopted as ametralladora Maxim modello 1902 (in 7x57 mm) on the orders of Emil Körner who was affiliated with DWM, and exported from the German Empire.
- Kingdom of Bulgaria: exported from the German Empire.
- British Empire: captured from the Germans during WWI.

== Gallery ==
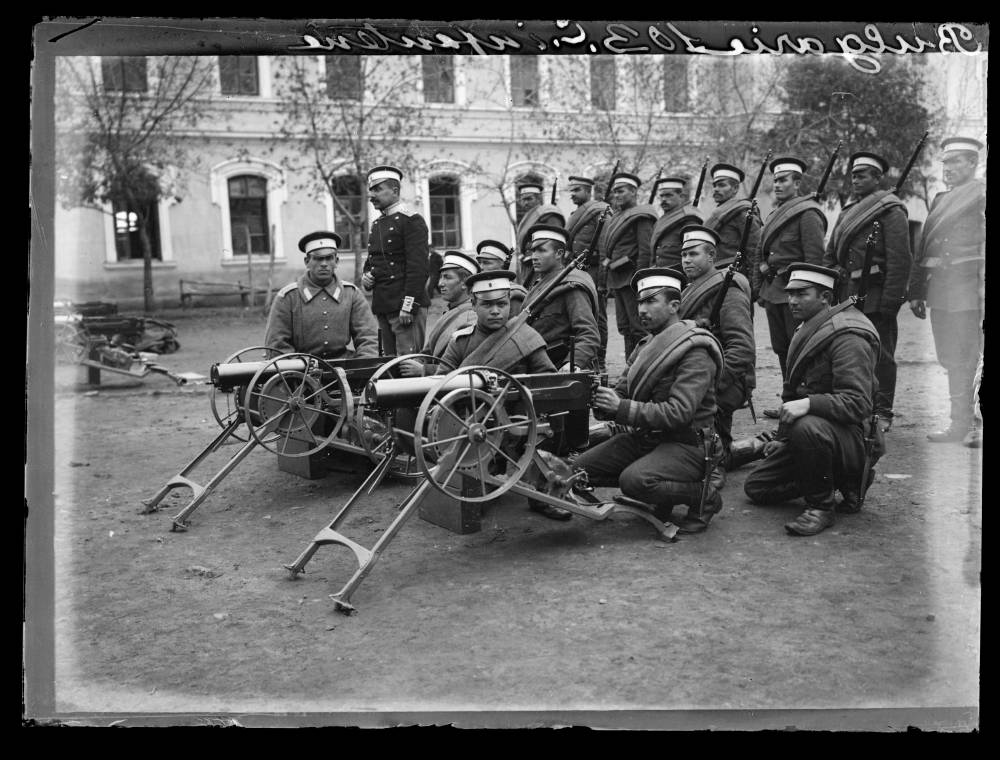
Bulgarian infantry with two MG 01s mounted with wheels, 1908.

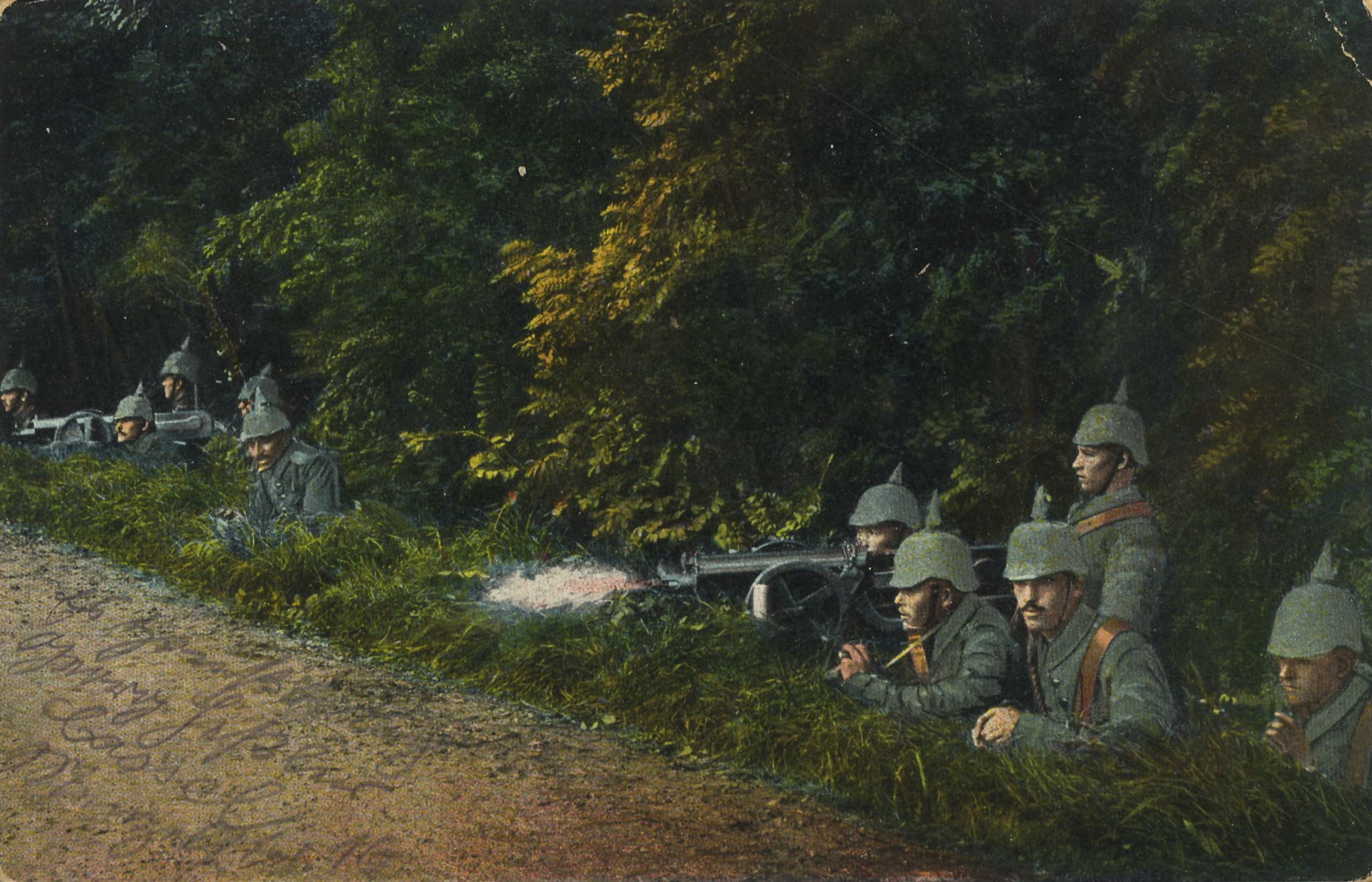
Postcard of German machine gun detachment with an MG 01, 1914.

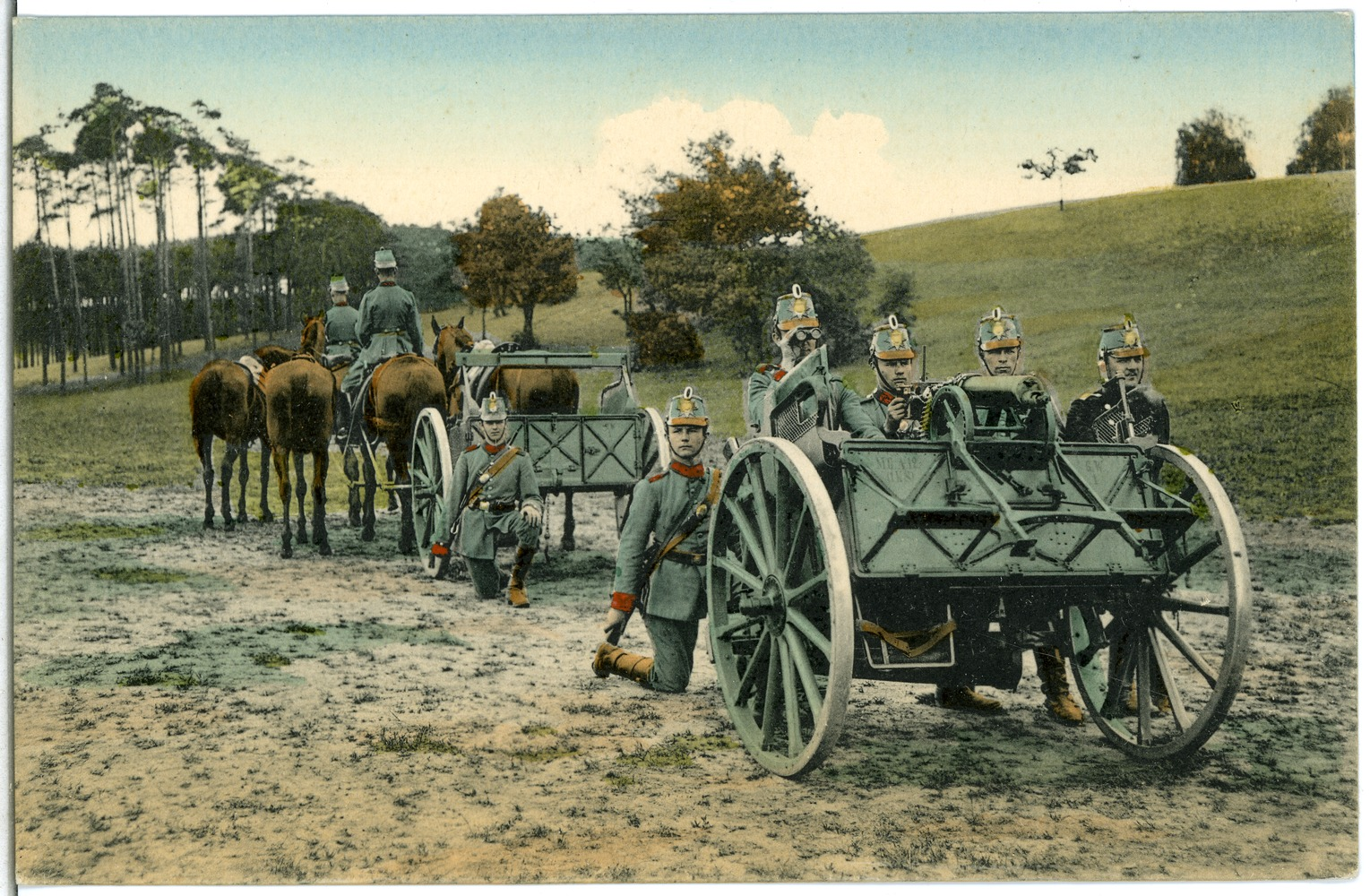
Postcard of the 1 Königlich Sächsische Maschinengewehr-Abteilung Nr. 12 (Royal Saxon Machine Gun Detachment No. 12) with MG 01 mounted on horse-drawn cart in Dresden, 1905.

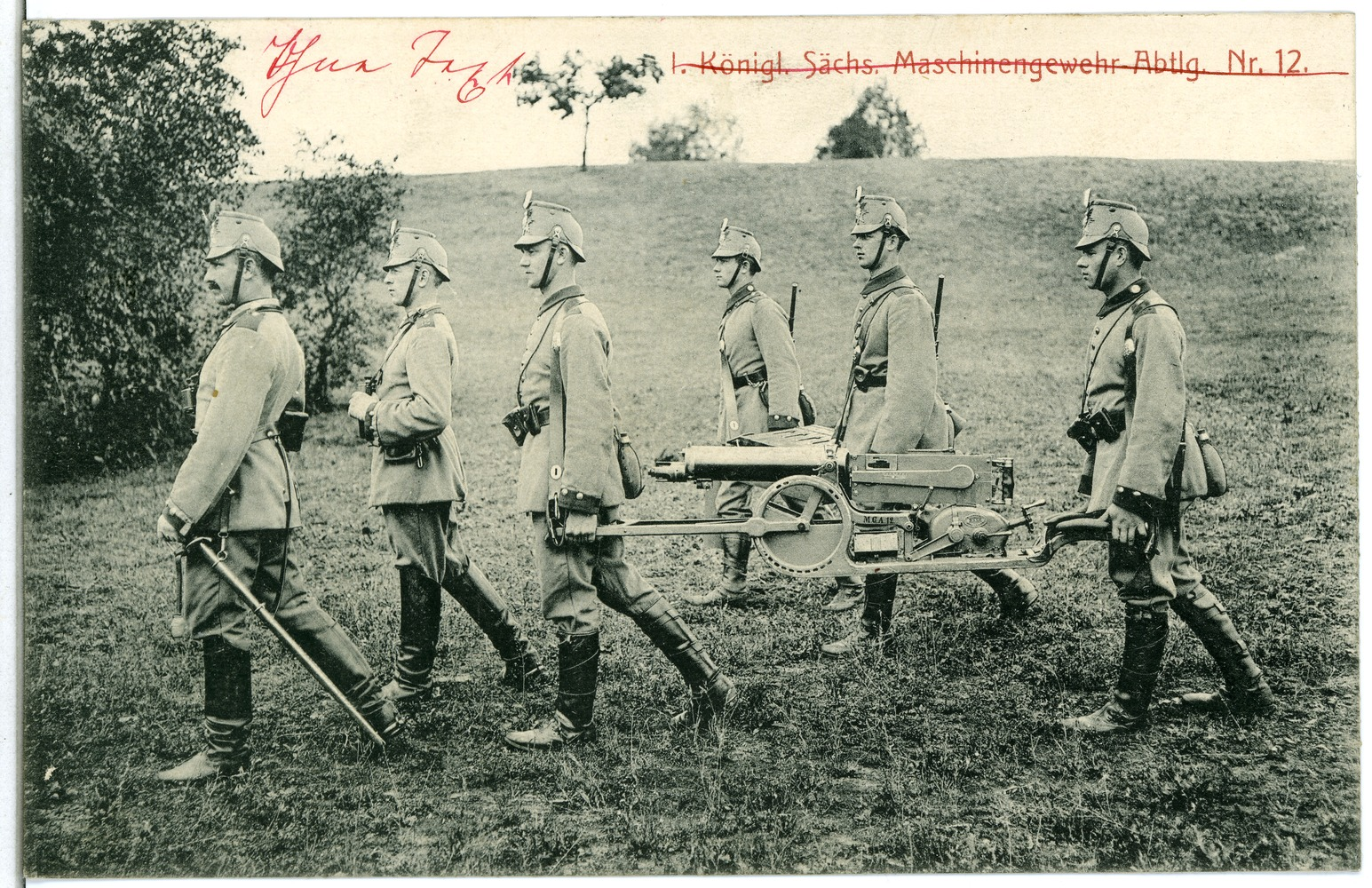
Postcard of the 1 Königlich Sächsische Maschinengewehr-Abteilung Nr. 12 (Royal Saxon Machine Gun Detachment No. 12) with MG 01 in Dresden, 1905.

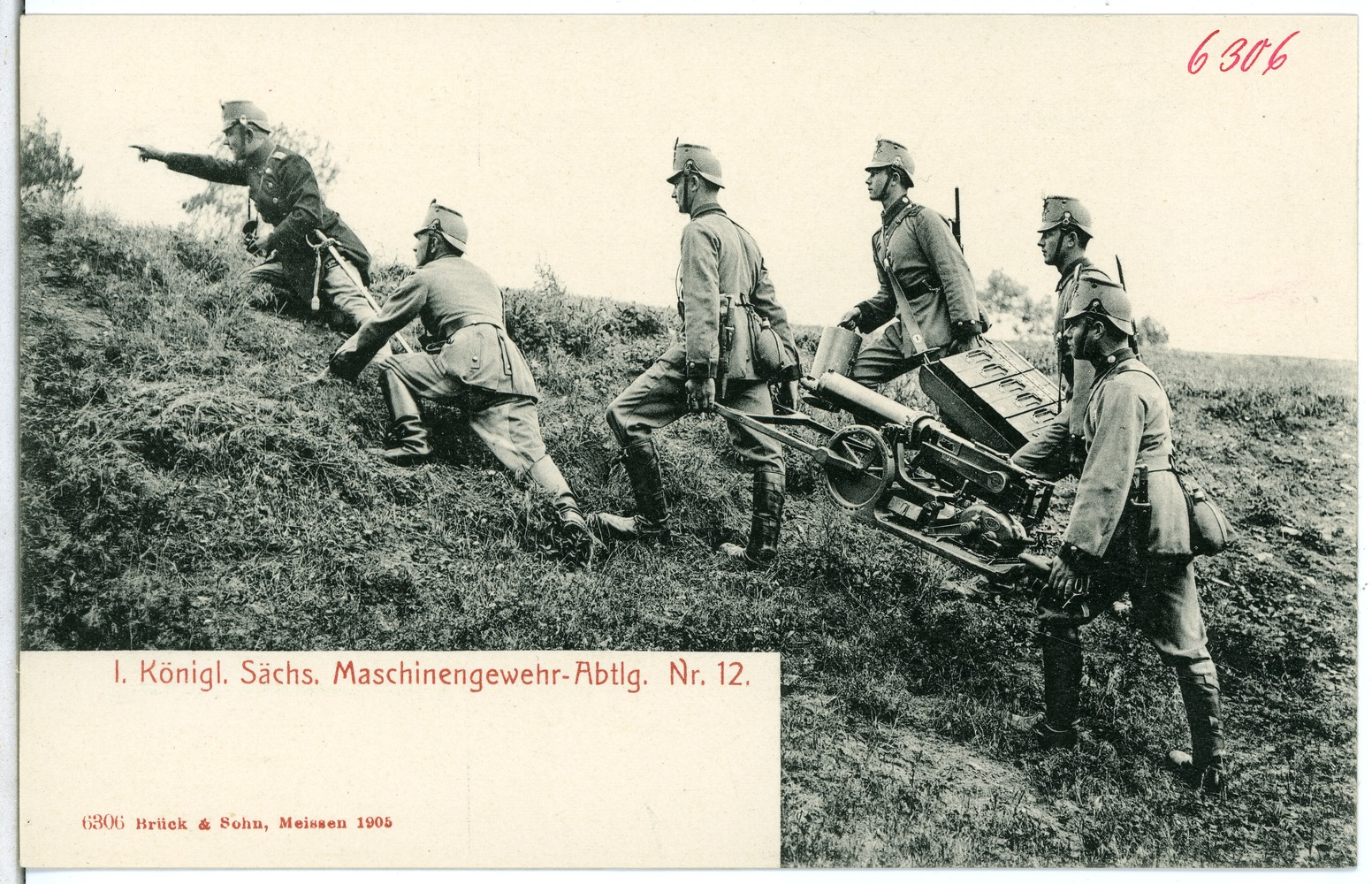
Postcard of the 1 Königlich Sächsische Maschinengewehr-Abteilung Nr. 12 (Royal Saxon Machine Gun Detachment No. 12) with MG 01 in Dresden, 1905.

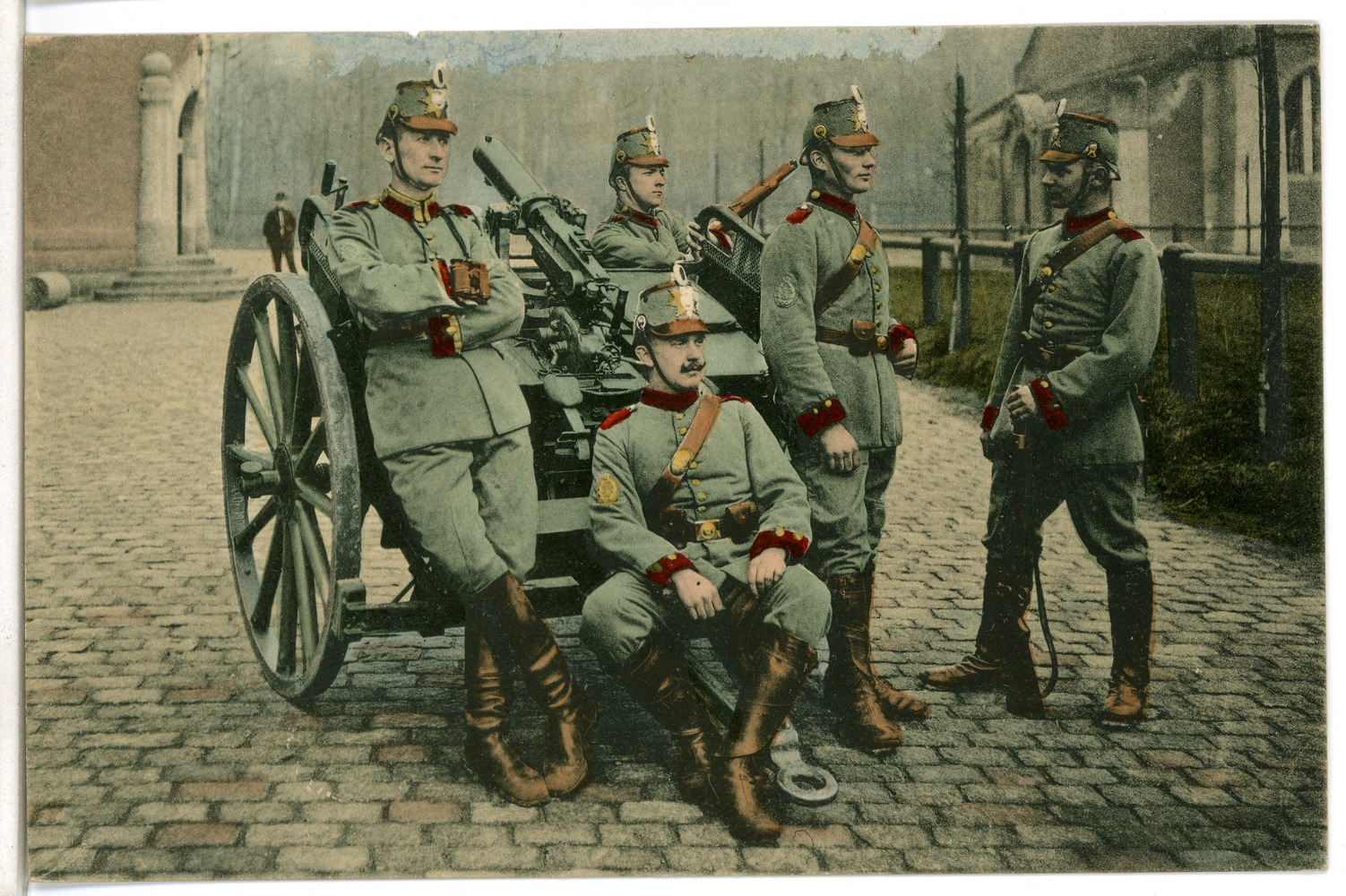
Postcard of the 1 Königlich Sächsische Maschinengewehr-Abteilung Nr. 12 (Royal Saxon Machine Gun Detachment No. 12) with an MG 01 mounted on horse-drawn cart in Dresden, 1908.

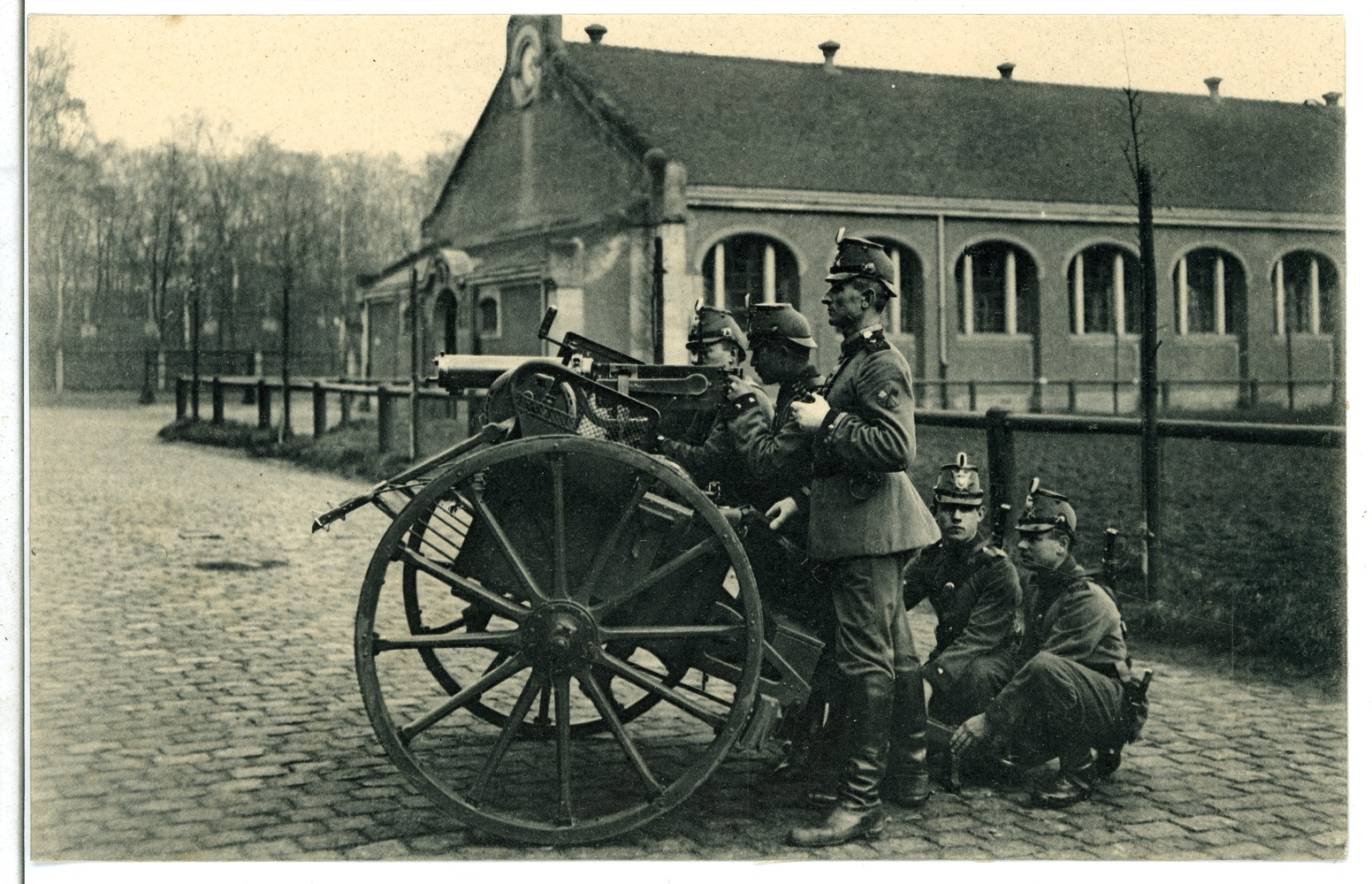
Photo of the 1 Königlich Sächsische Maschinengewehr-Abteilung Nr. 12 (Royal Saxon Machine Gun Detachment No.12) with an MG 01 mounted a on horse-drawn cart in Dresden, 1 January 1908.

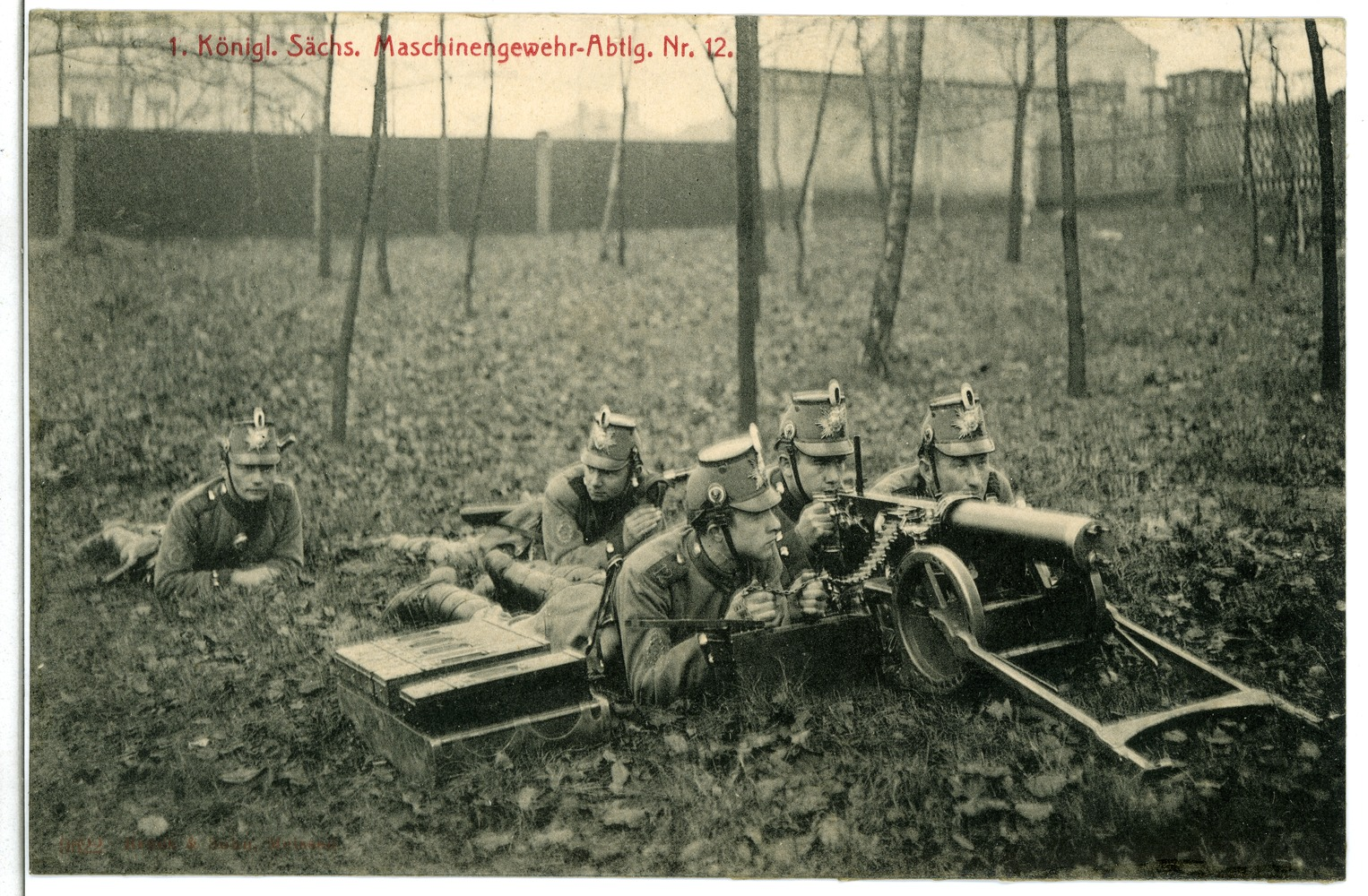
Postcard of the 1 Königlich Sächsische Maschinengewehr-Abteilung Nr. 12 (Royal Saxon Machine Gun Detachment No. 12) with an MG 01 in Dresden, 1908.

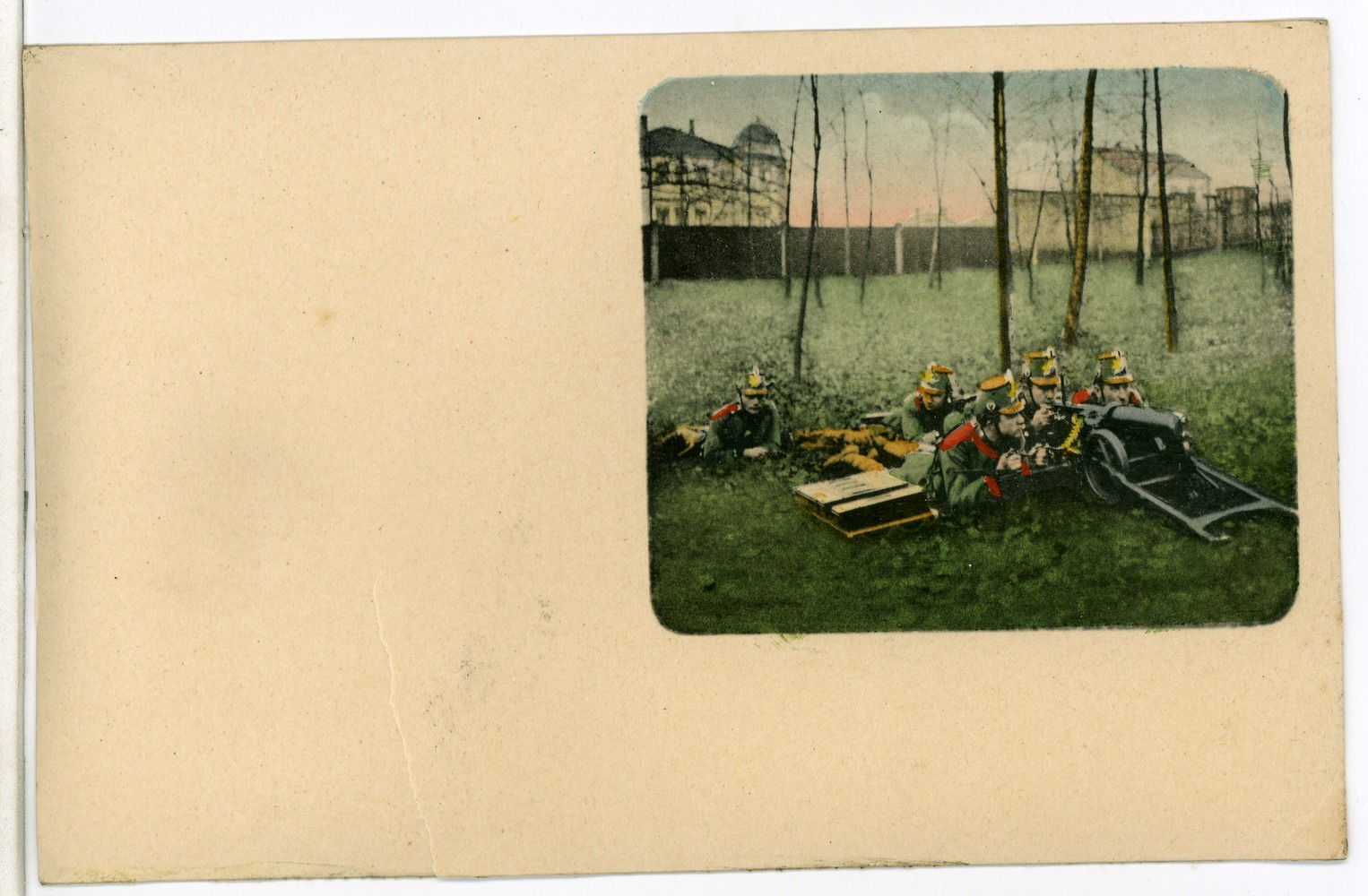
Postcard of the 1 Königlich Sächsische Maschinengewehr-Abteilung Nr. 12 (Royal Saxon Machine Gun Detachment No. 12) with MG 01 in Dresden, 1908.

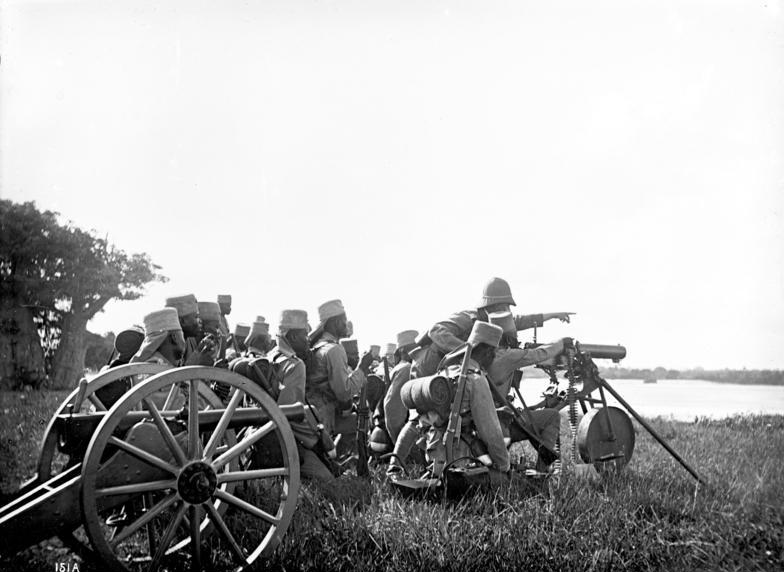
Schutztruppe machine gun detachment practicing with an MG 01 on a tripod mount in Deutsch-Ostafrika, between 1906 and 1918.

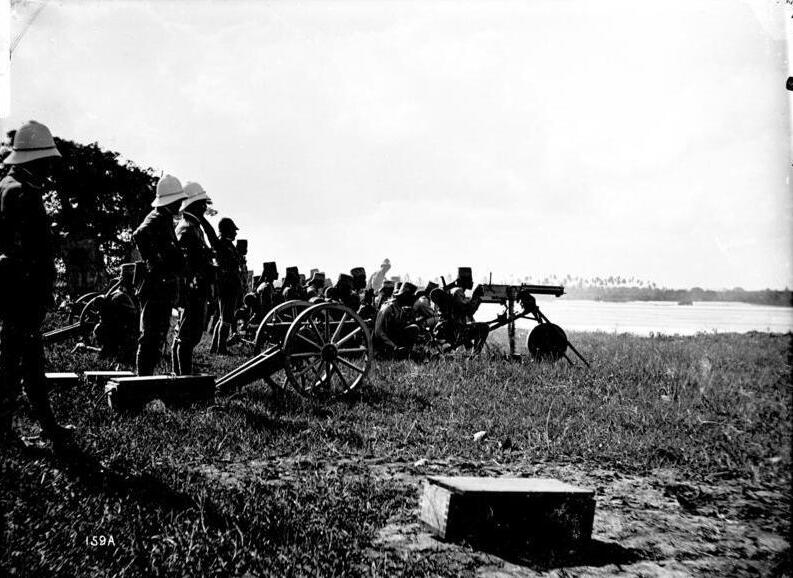
Schutztruppe machine gun detachment practicing with an MG 01 on a tripod mount in Deutsch-Ostafrika, between 1906 and 1918.

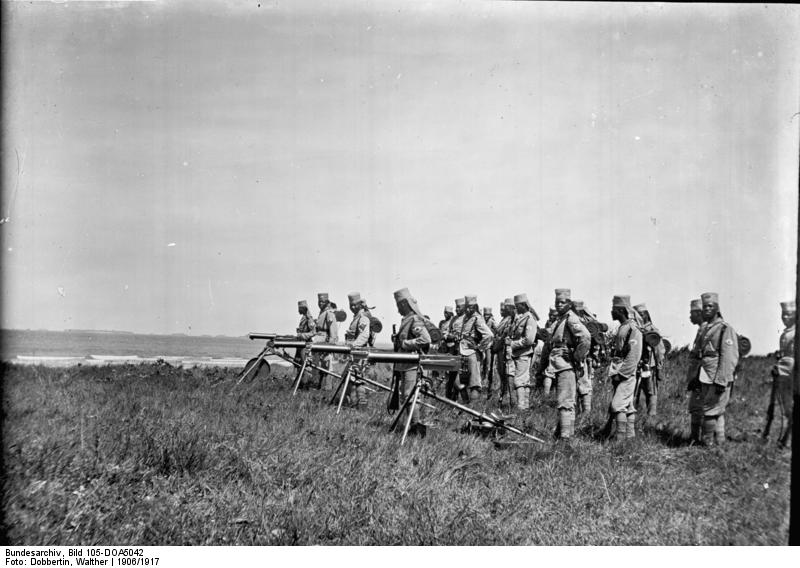
Schutztruppe machine gun detachment with what are probably MG 01s mounted on tripod mounts in Deutsch-Ostafrika, between 1906 and 1918.

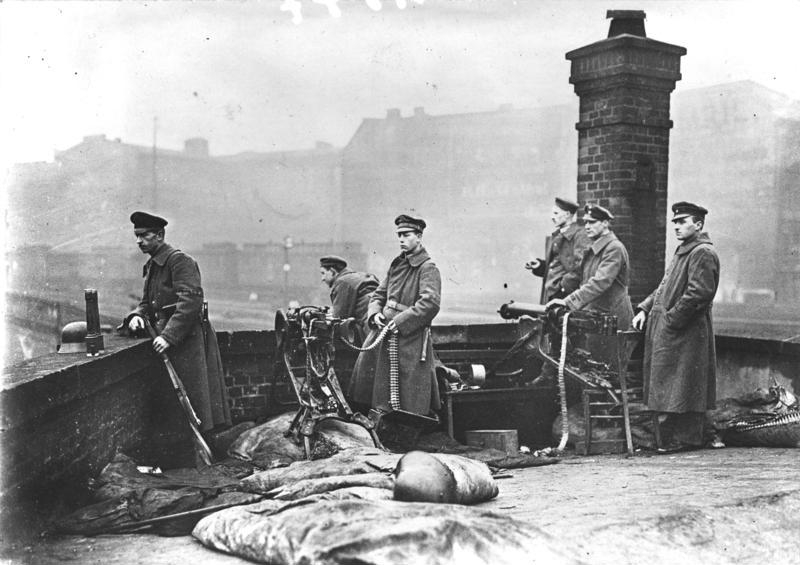
German soldiers during the Spartacist uprising occupying the Silesian train station in Berlin with an MG 01 and MG 08, 1919.

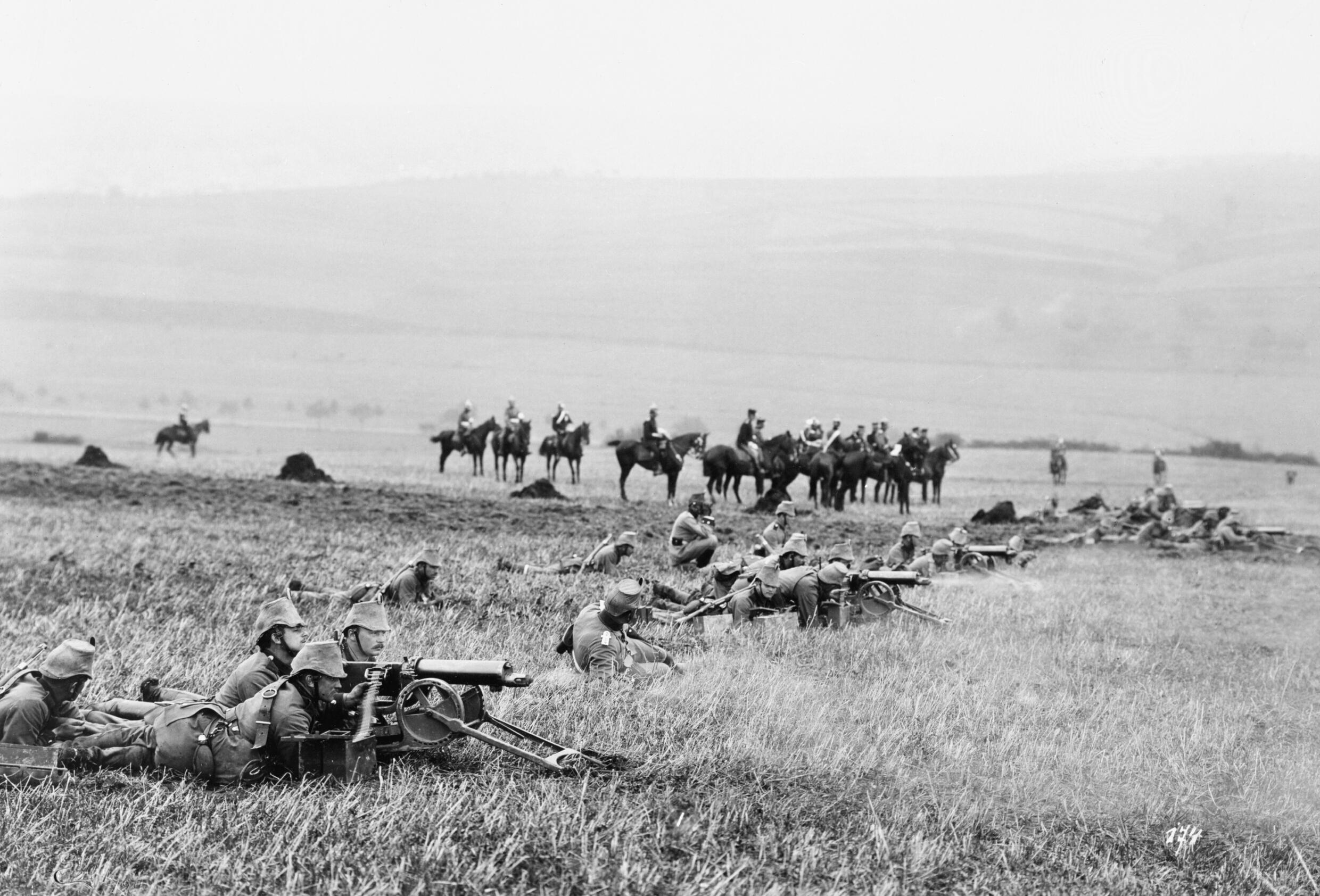
German machine gunners in action during the manoeuvres of 1905 with MG 01s.

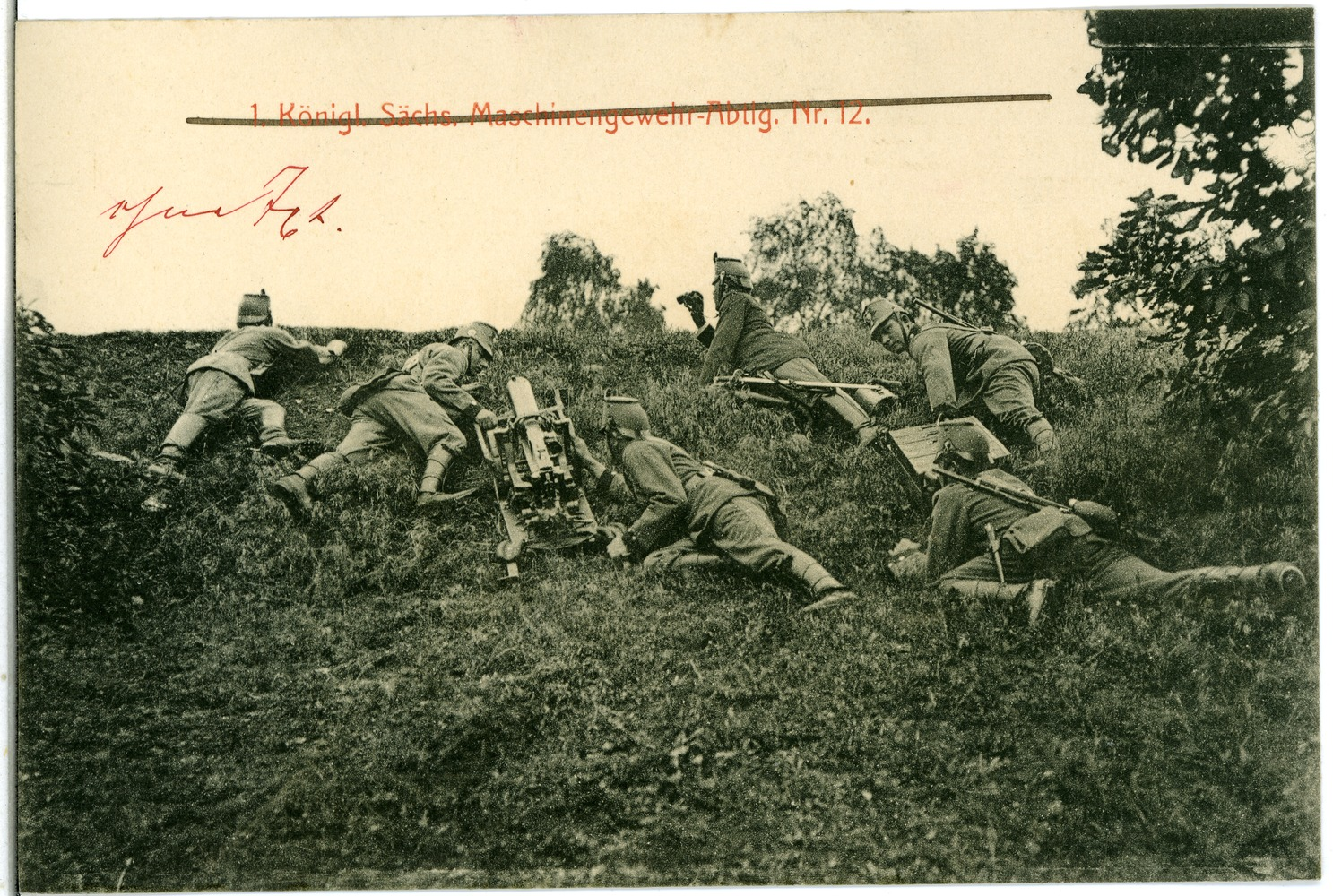
Postcard of the 1 Königlich Sächsische Maschinengewehr-Abteilung Nr. 12 (Royal Saxon Machine Gun Detachment No. 12) with MG 01 in Dresden, 1905.

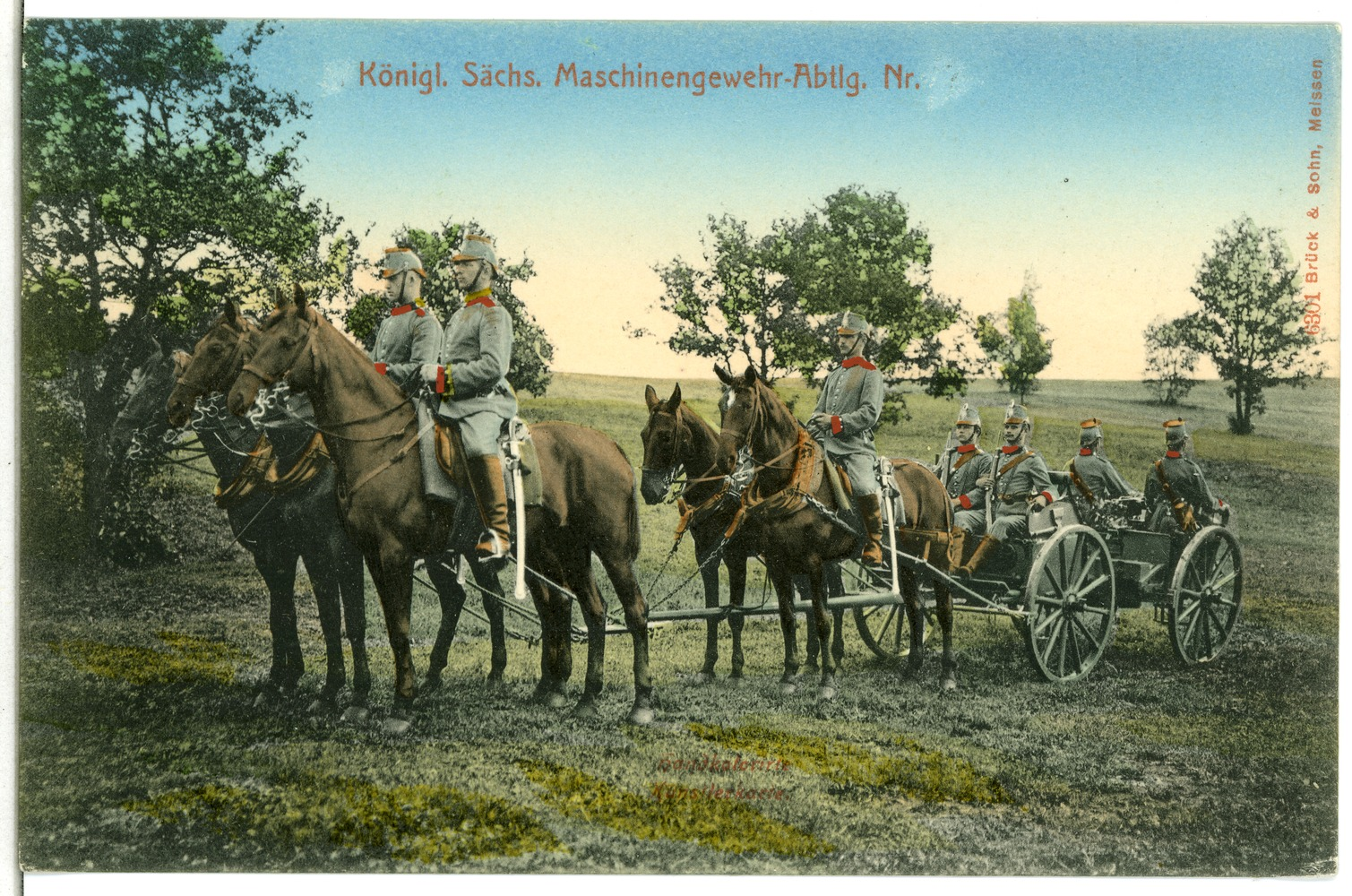
Postcard of the 1 Königlich Sächsische Maschinengewehr-Abteilung Nr. 12 (Royal Saxon Machine Gun Detachment No. 12) with an MG 01 mounted on horse-drawn cart in Dresden, 1905.

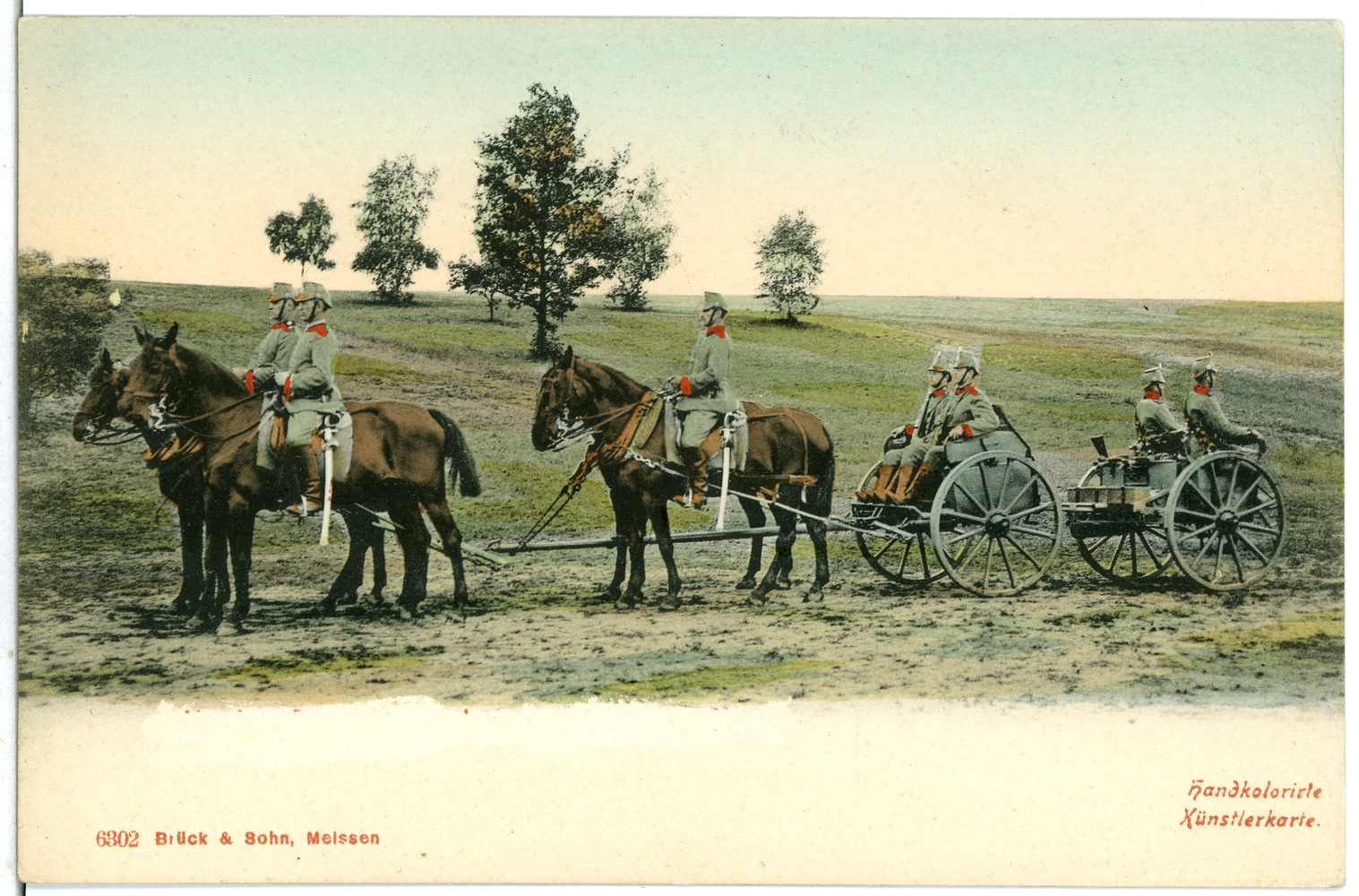
Postcard of the 1 Königlich Sächsische Maschinengewehr-Abteilung Nr. 12 (Royal Saxon Machine Gun Detachment No. 12) with an MG 01 mounted on horse-drawn cart in Dresden, 1905.

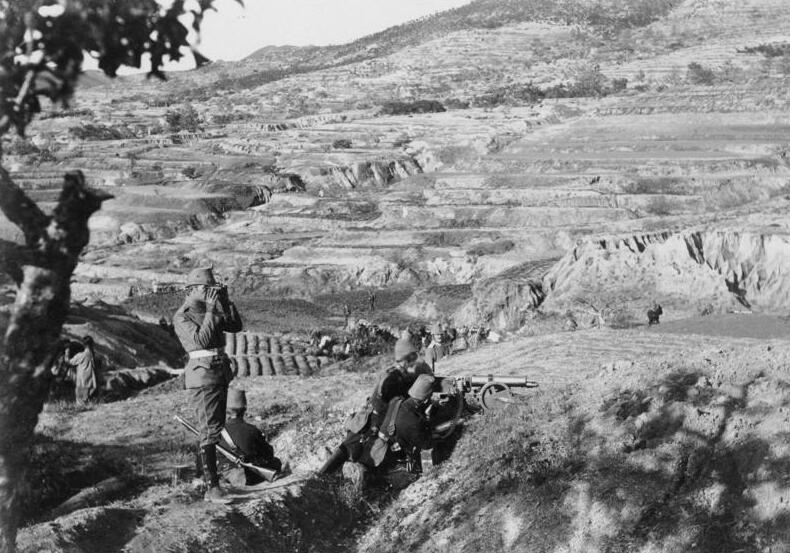
Machine gun detachment of the III. Seebataillon in the Mt. Bismark battery in Tsingtao with an MG 01, 1914.

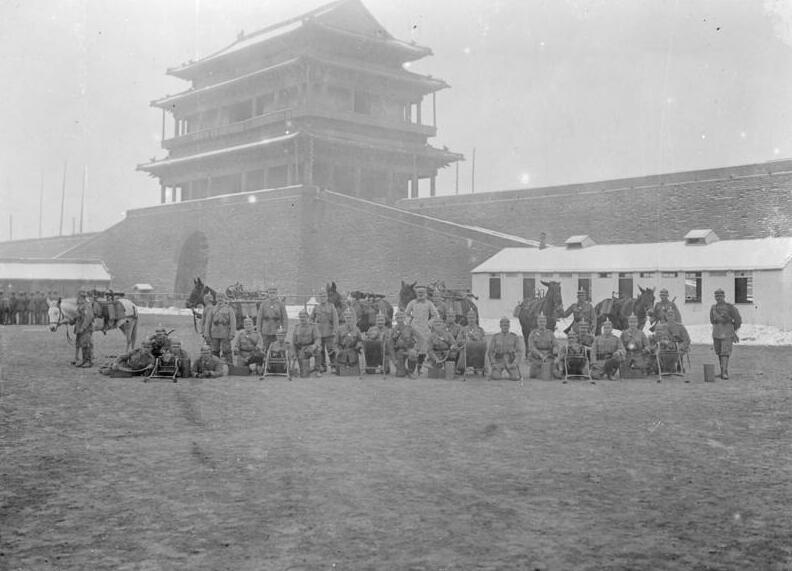
Machine Gun Company of the East Asian Occupation Brigade posing next to the Great Wall of China, 1905.
