= 1852 in Chile =

- Decades: 1830s; 1840s; 1850s; 1860s; 1870s
- See also: Other events of 1852; Timeline of Chilean history

The following lists events that happened during 1852 in Chile.

== Incumbents ==
President of Chile: Manuel Montt

== Births ==
- 17 February - Agustín Edwards Ross (died 1897)
- 21 October - José Toribio Medina (died 1930)

== Deaths ==
- 13 May - Francisco de la Lastra (born 1777)
