= 1854 in Chile =

- Decades: 1830s; 1840s; 1850s; 1860s; 1870s
- See also: Other events of 1854; Timeline of Chilean history

The following lists events that happened during 1854 in Chile.

== Incumbents ==
President of Chile: Manuel Montt

== Events ==
=== April ===
- April - The Chile 1854 Census is conducted.

== Births ==
- 9 September - Nicolás Palacios (d. 1911)

== Deaths ==
- 22 November - José Joaquín Prieto (b. 1786)
