= 1856 in Chile =

- Decades: 1830s; 1840s; 1850s; 1860s; 1870s
- See also: Other events of 1856; Timeline of Chilean history

The following lists events that happened during 1856 in Chile.

== Incumbents ==
- President of Chile: Manuel Montt

== Events ==
- Date unknown - 1856 Argentina–Chile treaty

=== September ===
- 18 September - Chilean presidential election, 1856

== Births ==
- 8 February - Alfredo Valenzuela Puelma (d. 1909)
- 11 May - Carlos Aldunate Solar (d. 1931)

== Deaths ==
- 19 June - Ventura Blanco Encalada (b. 1782)
