= 1859 in Chile =

- Decades: 1830s; 1840s; 1850s; 1860s; 1870s
- See also: Other events of 1859; Timeline of Chilean history

Events in the year 1859 in Chile.

== Incumbents ==
- President: Manuel Montt

== Events ==
- January 5–21 - Revolution of 1859
- March 14 - Revolution of 1859: Battle of Los Loros
- April 12 - Revolution of 1859: Battle of Maipon
- April 29 - Revolution of 1859: Battle of Cerro Grande
