= 1849 in Chile =

- Decades: 1820s; 1830s; 1840s; 1850s; 1860s
- See also: Other events of 1849; Timeline of Chilean history

The following lists events that happened during 1849 in Chile.

== Incumbents ==
President of Chile: Manuel Bulnes

== Events ==
=== July ===
- 6 July - The University of Santiago, Chile is established.

== Births ==
- 29 June - Pedro Montt (died 1910)

== Deaths ==
- 13 January - Francisco Ramón Vicuña (born 1775)
