= 1857 in Chile =

- Decades: 1830s; 1840s; 1850s; 1860s; 1870s
- See also: Other events of 1857; Timeline of Chilean history

The following lists events that happened during 1857 in Chile.

== Incumbents ==
- President of Chile: Manuel Montt

== Events ==
=== December ===
- 29 December - The National Party (Chile, 1857–1933) is established.

== Births ==
- 20 January - Luis Claro Solar (d. 1945)
- 18 April - Pedro Nolasco Cruz Vergara (d. 1939)
- 15 July - Henrique Bernardelli (d. 1936)

== Deaths ==
- date unknown - Joaquín Vicuña (b. 1786)
- 14 September - John Williams Wilson (b. 1798)
