= José María Urrutia Manzano =

Chilean politician

Senator, Republic of Chile
- In office 1831–1846
- Preceded by: Antonio del Castillo Saravia
- Succeeded by: Diego Tagle Echeverría
- Constituency: Biobío and Arauco

Personal details
- Born: 13 August 1781 Concepción, Viceroyalty of Peru
- Died: 17 December 1848 (aged 67) Chile Concepción, Chile
- Citizenship: Chile
- Party: Conservative Party of Chile
- Spouse: María de las Nieves Palacios y Pozo
- Occupation: Military; Lawyer

José María Urrutia Manzano (1771–1848) was a Chilean military man and politician.

== Career ==
José María Urrutia Manzano began his career first in the military, becoming lieutenant colonel of Cavalry in 1804. He graduated with a Bachelor of Law and Philosophy at the University of San Felipe in 1809.

He was the mayor of Concepción in 1800, 1811 and 1813.

He was elected alternate deputy for Concepción in 1831, but served instead as Senator for Biobío and Arauco from 1831 to 1846. During this period, he was part of the Standing Committee on War and the Navy.
