= Combat of Monte de Urra =

The Combat of Monte de Urra (Spanish: Combate de Monte de Urra) was a military engagement that took place on 19 November 1851, between the forces of President Manuel Montt, under the command of General Manuel Bulnes, and the Revolutionary Army of the South, led by General José María de la Cruz. The battle occurred at a property known as Monte de Urra, located approximately "nine blocks" away from the outskirts of Chillán (along the old road to Coihueco, now Andrés Bello Avenue).

The conflict began at one o'clock in the afternoon. Due to a flawed maneuver executed by Colonel Ignacio García, acting under Bulnes' orders, the cavalry became dispersed as they pursued a group of revolutionaries. Seizing the opportunity, the revolutionaries launched attacks and counterattacks, closely mirroring the movements of Bulnes' forces. Eventually, the revolutionaries were forced to disperse. The combat lasted for about two hours, resulting in 23 casualties on Bulnes' side and 11 among the revolutionaries.
