= Juana Roldán =

Chilean workers' and women's rights activist (1851–fl.1916)

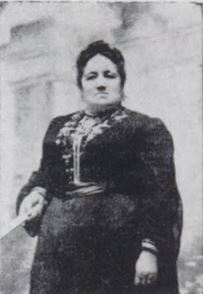
- Born: Juana Roldán Escobar; 1851; Santiago, Chile
- Spouse: Jenaro Alarcón Fardo (m. 1879)
- Children: 1

Juana Roldán de Alarcón (née Roldán Escobar; born 1851 – fl. 1916) was a Chilean workers' and women's rights activist, known for founding the Society for the Protection of Women.

== Biography ==
Roldán was born Juana Roldán Escobar in 1851 in Santiago to José Dolores Roldán and Dominga Escobar. Roldán grew up in a working class family.

On 23 September 1883, Roldán began working at the José Miguel Infante Philharmonic and became known for defending workers rights. Inspired by the 1887 establishment of the Women Workers' Mutual Aid Society in Valparaíso, Roldán founded a Mutual aid society in Santiago the following year. Originally established as Society for the Emancipation of Women, the name was quickly changed to the Society for the Protection of Women following outrage amongst working-class women over the use of "Emancipation" within the group's title. Roldán served as the societies inaugural president. Valeria Alejandra Olivares-Olivares contends that this outrage was indicative of the resistance to women's emancipation which existed within Chilean women's associations during the late 19th century.

Roldán also contributed to La Alborada, a newspaper for working-class women which circulated from 1905 to 1907.

== Personal life ==
In 1879, Roldán married Jenaro Alarcón Fardo (born 1857), a worker's right activist and founder of the Democrat Party. Roldán and Alarcón had at least one child.
