= El Ferrocarril =

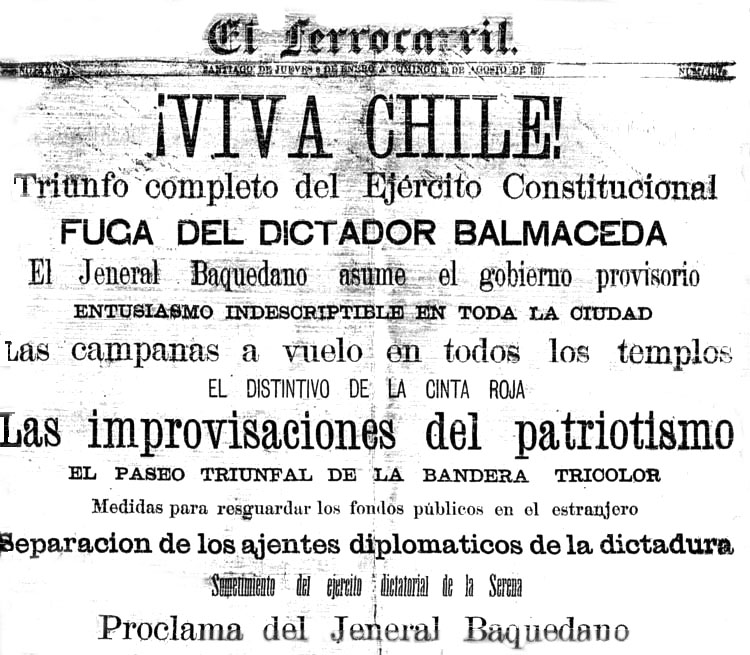
- Type: Daily newspaper
- Format: Broadsheet
- Founded: December 22, 1855
- Political alignment: Right-wing, Liberal

El Ferrocarril was a liberal Chilean newspaper created in 1855 to support the administration of president Manuel Montt. The newspaper was published for a last time on September 20, 1911.

== See also ==
- El Mercurio de Valparaíso
