= Jorge Boonen =

Chilean politician and general

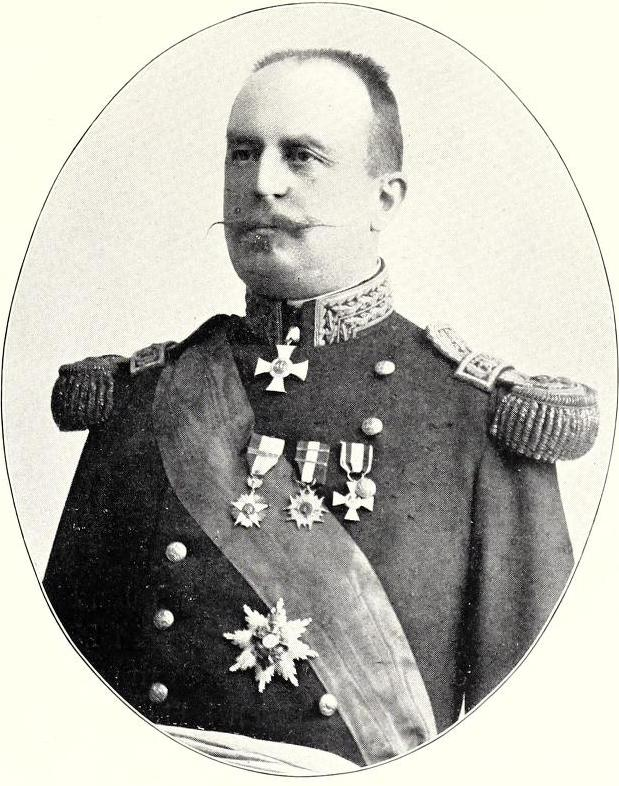
- Boonen in 1904

Minister of War and Navy
- In office 1916–1916
- Preceded by: Cornelio Saavedra Montt
- Succeeded by: Oscar Urzúa

Inspector General of the Chilean Army
- In office 19 April 1910 – 26 April 1921
- Preceded by: Emil Körner
- Succeeded by: Arístides Pinto

Personal details
- Born: 16 April 1858 Valparaíso, Chile
- Died: 6 December 1921 (aged 63) Santiago, Chile
- Military career
- Allegiance: Chile
- Branch: Chilean Army
- Rank: Division General
- Commands: Inspector General of the Chilean Army
- Conflicts: War of the Pacific; Chilean Civil War of 1891

Jorge Boonen Rivera (16 April 1858 – 6 December 1921) was a Chilean Army general and military engineer who served as Inspector General of the Chilean Army from 1910 to 1921.

His military career spanned the institutional reforms that followed the War of the Pacific and the adoption of German-influenced organization and training within the Chilean Army.

== Early life and military career ==
Boonen was born in Valparaíso on 16 April 1858, the son of Eduardo Boonen von Baerlem, who was born in Belgium, and Úrsula Rivera y Serrano.

He entered the Chilean Army as a second lieutenant after being mobilized during the War of the Pacific. By the end of the conflict, he had attained the rank of captain. His engineering background and knowledge of foreign languages led to assignments with tactical units and the general staff.

During the War of the Pacific, Boonen participated in the capture of Pisagua on 2 November 1879, the Battle of Dolores later that month, and the Battle of Tacna on 26 May 1880. He subsequently took part in the Battle of Chorrillos and Miraflores in January 1881, as well as operations at Tarata, in the Sierra campaign and at Arequipa.

In 1884, Boonen was sent to Spain as a military attaché. While in Europe, he examined the organization and curricula of Spanish and German military institutions. Drawing on these observations, he prepared reports on possible reforms to the Chilean Army, including the establishment of a general staff.

Boonen continued to advance through the officer corps, becoming sergeant major in 1885, lieutenant colonel in 1889 and colonel in 1891. During the Chilean Civil War of 1891, he participated in the battles of Concón and Placilla. He was promoted to brigadier general in 1898 and division general in 1903.

== Inspector General of the Army ==
On 19 April 1910, Boonen succeeded Emil Körner as Inspector General of the Chilean Army, at the time the institution's senior command position. He remained in office until 26 April 1921 and was succeeded by Arístides Pinto.

His tenure continued the process of military reorganization associated with Körner and the German influence on the Chilean officer corps. German military missions remained active in Chile, while the Army's organization, professional education and training continued to draw upon German and Prussian models.

In 1911, Boonen travelled to Germany, where he participated in the inspection and acceptance of Krupp 105 mm artillery acquired for the Chilean Army.

The Chilean military system also attracted interest elsewhere in Latin America during his period in command, with Chilean Army personnel serving as instructors in countries including Colombia, Ecuador and El Salvador.

Boonen issued restrictions on the membership of military personnel in certain philosophical or similar organizations. The measure became the subject of political controversy and led to an accusation against him in the Chamber of Deputies of Chile in 1916, which did not result in his removal from office.

== Military ranks ==
- 1879 – Second lieutenant
- 1881 – Lieutenant
- 1882 – Captain
- 1885 – Sergeant major
- 1889 – Lieutenant colonel
- 1891 – Colonel
- 1898 – Brigadier general
- 1903 – Division general

== Works ==
Boonen wrote on military geography, including:

- Ensayo sobre la geografía militar de Chile, vol. I, Imprenta Cervantes.
- Ensayo sobre la geografía militar de Chile, vol. II, Imprenta Cervantes.

== Bibliography ==
- Onetto, Richardo (2019). "Influjo del General Jorge Boonen Rivera en el pensamiento militar del siglo XX". Memorial del Ejército de Chile (503): 143–154.
