= Roger Connor (disambiguation) =

Roger Connor (1857–1931) was a Major League Baseball player. Roger Connor may also refer to:

- Roger Connor (judge) (born 1939), British judge
- Roger G. Connor (1926–1999), justice of the Alaska Supreme Court

== See also ==
- Roger O'Connor (1762–1834), Irish nationalist and writer
- Roger Connors (fl. 1980s–2000s), American management consultant and author
