= Arthur O'Connor (United Irishman) =

Irish politician

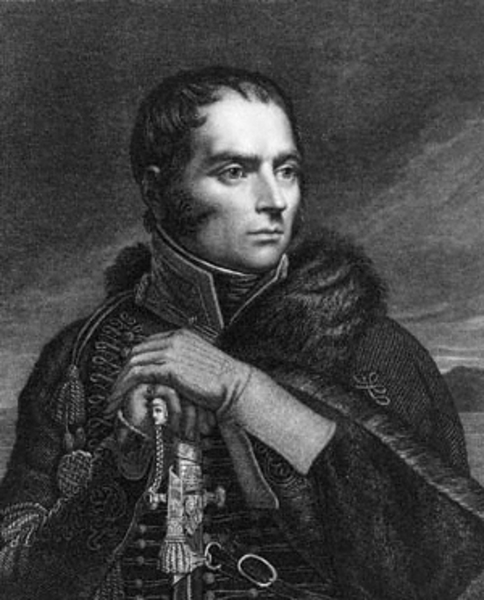
- O'Connor in French military uniform

Member of Parliament for Philipstown
- In office 1790–1795
- Preceded by: John Toler; Henry Cope
- Succeeded by: William Sankey; John Longfield

Personal details
- Born: 4 July 1763 Bandon, County Cork
- Died: 25 April 1852 (aged 88)
- Spouse: Alexandrine Louise Sophie de Caritat de Condorcet (m. 1807)
- Relations: Roger O'Connor (brother)
- Children: 5, including Daniel

Arthur O'Connor (4 July 1763 – 25 April 1852) was a United Irishman who was active in seeking allies for the Irish cause in England and in France. A proponent of radical democratic reform, in Ireland he was distinguished by publishing political appeals to women. Arrested on the eve of the 1798 rebellion, in 1802 he went into exile in France where, after being raised to the rank of General in a force that was to invade Ireland, fell out of favour with Napoleon. Among the positions he maintained publicly in his final years were a defence of the July Revolution in Paris and opposition to what he saw as the clericalism of Daniel O'Connell's movement in Ireland.

== Early life ==
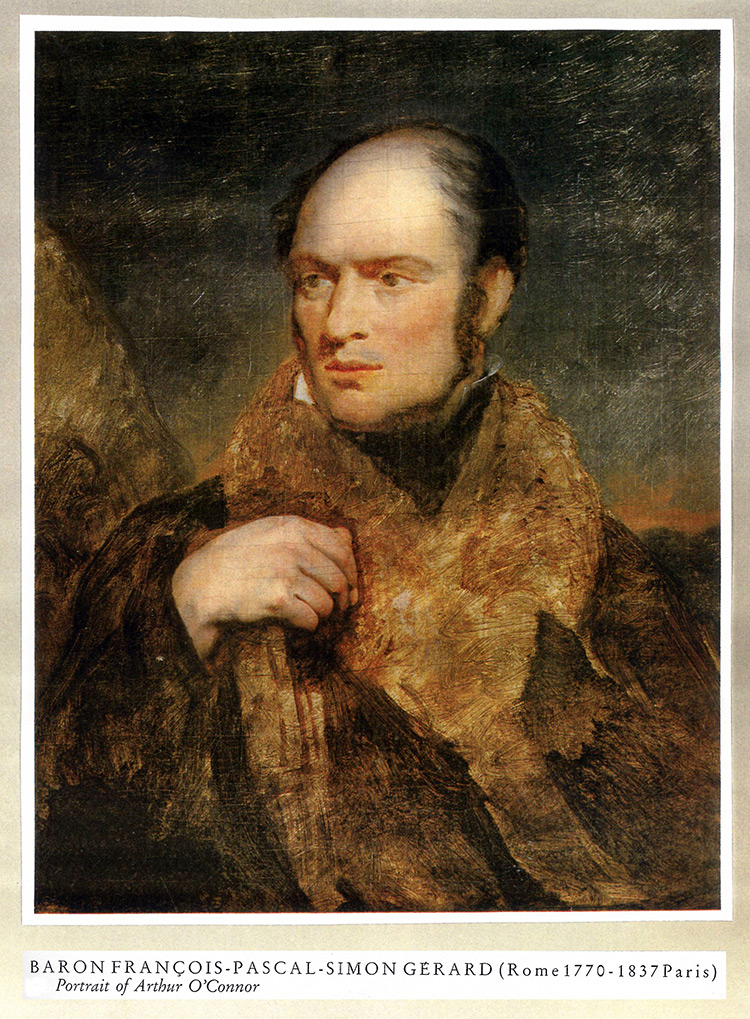
Portrait of O'Connor, by François Gérard

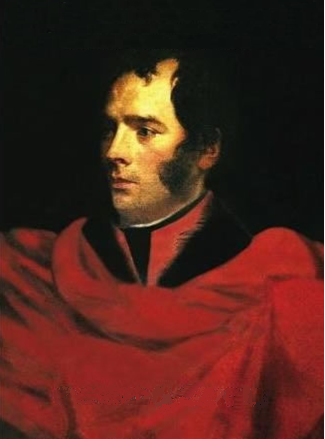
Arthur O'Connor

O'Connor was born near Bandon, County Cork on 4 July 1763 into a wealthy Irish Protestant family. Through his brother Roger O'Connor, who was equally enthused by events in America was to share his republican politics, he was an uncle to Roderic O'Connor, Francisco Burdett O'Connor, and Feargus O'Connor among others. His other two brothers, Daniel and Robert, were pro-British loyalists. A sister, Anne, committed suicide, after having been forbidden by the family from marrying a Catholic man with whom she was in love.

O'Connor graduated with a law degree from Trinity College, Dublin, and was called to the bar in 1788. But inheriting a fortune worth £1,500 a year, he never practised.

== United Irishman ==
From 1790 to 1795 O'Connor was a Member of Parliament in the Irish House of Commons for Philipstown. He attached himself to the patriot party of Henry Grattan, joining in the calls to advance the emancipation of the kingdom's Roman Catholic majority and for other reforms.

At the time, this did not debar him from the influential Kildare Street Club, a bailiwick of the landed Protestant Ascendancy. But the accommodation was short lived. In 1796 O'Connor joined the Society of United Irishmen, whose purpose was to overturn the Ascendancy and establish a representative national government independent both of sacramental tests and of dictation from London.

In January 1797, with United Irish support, he contested what had been his uncle Lord Longueville's parliamentary seat in Antrim. To the "free electors" of the county he commended the "entire abolition of religious distinctions" and the "establishment of a National Government", while protesting the "invasion" of the country by English and Scottish troops and the Crown's continued war against the French Republic. Arrests, including his own in February for seditious libel, frustrated his attempts to canvass. The Dublin Castle administration, he explained to "those who were electors", had "destroyed every vestige of election by martial law". With Lord Edward Fitzgerald and others in the United Irish leadership in Dublin his thoughts now turned to securing French support for a republican insurrection.

In a final address "To the Irish Nation" (February 1798) he asked:

Shall beggary and famine stalk through your country, so blessed with a temperate climate and a fertile soil, without the strongest suspicion that the people have not been done justice? Shall a brave, healthy, intelligent and generous people, be doomed to the most squalid misery at home, and be famed for enterprise, activity and industry in every country but their own, without the strongest suspicion that they have been made prey to peculation, injustice, and oppression. Shall a country ... be most advantageously placed on the globe between the old and the new world, yet posses such inconsiderable foreign trade ... without the strongest suspicion of perfidy in her government, and treason in her legislature?

He called for a "representative democracy", based on "universal suffrage", and tasked with breaking all "monopoly"—in property as well as in religion.

== Appeal to the women of Ireland ==
In London, with his brother Roger, O’Connor had moved in the same radical circles as the United Irish agent Jane Greg. Greg—possibly in the company of O'Connor—returned to Belfast where she was reported to the authorities as being "very active at the head of the Female [United Irish] Societies" in the town. O'Connor himself made a political appeal to women.

After the presses of the Northern Star in Belfast had been smashed by the military, with William Sampson and Drennan he founded a new paper, the Press, in Dublin. Writing in its pages in December 1797 as "Philoguanikos", he called on women to take sides in the coming conflict. He assured them that "the youth of this country have totally changed their mode of thinking" regarding women and were ready to seek their "society", their "friendship" and "alliance". It was now only "brainless bedlams" that recoiled from "the idea of a female politician".

In February 1798, O'Connor's paper published a second address, signed "Marcus" (William Drennan). In this it was equally clear that women were being appealed to as "members of a critically-debating public":

== Arrest and imprisonment ==
While travelling to France in March 1798 he was arrested alongside Father James Coigly, a Catholic priest, and two other United Irishmen Benjamin Binns (also of the London Corresponding Society), and John Allen. Coigly, found to be carrying clear evidence of treason (an address from "The Secret Committee of England” to the Directory of France), was hanged. O'Connor, able to call Charles James Fox, Lord Moira and Richard Brinsley Sheridan to testify to his character, was acquitted but was immediately re-arrested and imprisoned. On his way to confinement, he handed on a poem, which seemed to recant his republican beliefs. If the first line of the second stanza is read following the first line of the first stanza, and the alternating process is continued the opposite is the case: it is a ringing affirmation of his Painite convictions:

(1) The pomp of courts, and pride of kings,
(3) I prize above all earthly things;
(5) I love my country, but my king,
(7) Above all men his praise I'll sing.
(9) The royal banners are display'd,
(11) And may success the standard aid:

(2) I fain would banish far from hence
(4) The Rights of Man and Common Sense.
(6) Destruction to that odious name,
(8) The plague of princes, Thomas Paine,
(10) Defeat and ruin seize the cause
(12) Of France, her liberty, and laws.

O'Connor was held at Fort George in Scotland with other leading United Irishmen, among whom he was not fondly regarded. He frequently quarrelled with his associates, and made clear his dislike for Thomas Addis Emmet, William MccNeven and William Lawless.

== Exile in France ==
O'Connor was released in 1802 under the condition of "banishment". He travelled to Paris, where he was regarded as the accredited representative of the United Irishmen by Napoleon. In February 1804, the future emperor appointed him General of Division for the Irish Legion being readied in Brittany for an invasion of Ireland. According to the Nouvelle biographie générale (Paris, 1855) the "openness of his character, and his unalterable attachment to the cause of liberty rendered him little agreeable to Napoleon" who, after abandoning plans for Ireland, did not again employ him. On the other hand, it is the recollection of Paul Barras, who had been President of the French Directory, that it been by "compliance and boasting" that he had obtained from Napoleon, as emperor, all that the Directory had denied him. In either case, as he had had no military experience, his appointment was resented by many of his compatriots in the Legion.

Robert Emmet did not entrust O'Connor in Paris with representing his plans for a renewed insurrection in Ireland. When Britain re-opened its war with France in May 1803, Emmett sent his own emissary, Patrick Gallagher, to Paris to ask "money, arms, ammunition and officers" but not, as O'Connor had urged, for large numbers of troops. After his rising in Dublin misfired in July, and he could no longer indulge his hostility to Napoleon's imperial ambition, Emmet entrusted his plea for a French force to the rebel veteran Myles Byrne.

After Napoleon's final defeat, O'Connor became a naturalised French citizen. He supported the 1830 insurrection in Paris which overthrew the increasingly absolutist King Charles X, publishing a defence of events in the form of an open letter to General Lafayette. After the revolution, he became mayor of Le Bignon-Mirabeau. He edited a paper on advanced/heterodox religious opinions—Journal de la Liberté Religieuse—and published a number of works on political and social topics. He also assisted his wife and her mother, Sophie de Condorcet (an accomplished translator of Thomas Paine and Adam Smith), to prepare a revised edition of the works of his father-in-law, the Marquis de Condorcet (published in twelve volumes between 1847 and 1849).

In 1834, O'Connor had been permitted to visit Ireland with his wife, to dispose of his estates that had been managed by his brother. Daniel O'Connell was then transforming what had been the Catholic Association into a movement for the repeal of the Act of Union. O'Connor was highly critical of what he perceived as the continued mobilisation (heavily reliant on the cooperation of the clergy) of a distinct Catholic interest. In his last work Monopoly: The Cause of all Evil (1848), a largely theological treatise in which he rejects the exclusionary claims of a "corporate priesthood", he accused "O'Connell and his jesuit priests" of working to undo all that he, and the United Irish, sought to achieve in overcoming "religious hatred" and securing "union, love [and] fraternity" between Irishmen.

== Personal life ==
In 1807, although more than twice her age, O'Connor married Alexandrine Louise Sophie de Caritat de Condorcet (b 1790/1-1859), known as Eliza, the daughter of the French philosophe the Marquis de Condorcet and the celebrated salon hostess, Sophie de Condorcet (Sophie de Grouchy).

Following his marriage he borrowed money from fellow United Irish exile William Putnam McCabe to acquire a country residence. O’Connor's tardiness in repaying the debt to McCabe, whose own investments into cotton spinning in Rouen failed, resulted in a lawsuit. Cathal O'Bryne suggests that the debt was behind O'Connor's later suggestion to R. R. Madden that McCabe had been a double agent, a charge to which, Madden notes, the French government lent no credence.

O'Connor's wife gave birth to five children, three sons and two daughters, almost all of whom predeceased him. Only one son, Daniel, married and had issue.

- Daniel O'Connor (1810–1851), who married Ernestine Duval du Fraville (1820–1877), a daughter of Laurent-Martin Duval, Baron Duval du Fraville, in 1843. She died at Cannes in 1877.

O'Connor died on 25 April 1852. His widow died in 1859.

=== Descendants ===
His descendants continued to serve, as officers, in the French army and still reside at Château du Bignon. Through his only surviving son Daniel, he was a grandfather of two boys, Arthur O'Connor (1844–1909), who served in the French army, and Fernand O'Connor (1847–1905), a Brigade General who served in Africa and was made a Knight of the Legion of Honour. His grandson, Arthur, married Marguerite de Ganay (1859–1940), a daughter of Emily and Etienne, Marquis de Ganay, in 1878. They had two daughters, Elisabeth O'Connor, the wife of Alexandre de La Taulotte; and Brigitte Emilie Fernande O'Connor (1880–1948), who in 1904 married the Comte François de La Tour du Pin (1878–1914), who was killed ten years later at the Battle of the Marne. (Note: They had two sons and one daughter: Aymar de la Tour du Pin, Marquis de la Tour du Pin-Chambly (1906–1979), Patrice de la Tour du Pin (1911–1975), and Philis de la Tour du Pin.)

== Publications ==
- The Measures of Ministry to Prevent a Revolution: Are the Certain Means of Bringing it on (1794)
- A Letter to the Earl of Carlisle, Occasioned by His Lordship's Reply to Earl Fitzwilliam's Two Letters, Exhibiting the Present State of Parties in Ireland (1795)
- The State of Ireland (1798)
- Paddy's Resource: Being a Select Collection of Original and Modern Patriotic Songs: : Compiled for the Use of the People of Ireland (1798)
- The Portrait of an Irish Executive Director, by Himself and His Friends (1799)
- État actuel de la Grande-Bretagne (1804)
- Lettre du général Arthur Condorcet O'connor au général La Fayette: sur les causes qui ont privé la France des avantages de la révolution de 1830 (1831)
- État religieux de la France et de l'Europe d'après les sources les plus authentiques avec les controverses sur la séparation de lÉglise et de l'État, Volumes 1 à 2 (written with François-André Isambert and Charles Lasteyrie, 1844)
- Monopoly: The Cause of all Evil (1848). Le monopole, cause de tous les maux (1849)

== See also ==
- John Allen

Parliament of Ireland
Preceded by John Toler; Henry Cope	Member of Parliament for Philipstown; 1790–1795; With: William Sankey	Succeeded by William Sankey; John Longfield
