= John Allen (Irish nationalist) =

- Born: c. 1780; Dublin, Ireland
- Died: 10 February 1855; Caen, France
- Military career
- Allegiance: United Irishmen; First French Empire
- Rank: Colonel
- Unit: Irish Legion
- Conflicts: Irish rebellion of 1803, Peninsular War, Saxon Campaign 1813

John Allen (c. 1780–1855) was a United Irishman, committed to an independent Irish republic. After a failed attempt with Robert Emmet in 1803 to renew the United Irish insurrection crushed five years before, he went into French exile and served with distinction in the army of Napoleon.

== United Irishman ==
John Allen was a Protestant native of Dublin, where he was for some time a partner in a drapery business. He joined the Society of United Irishmen in the city and became involved in a broader conspiracy to coordinate an Irish insurrection with a French landing in the British Isles and a rising by Jacobin radicals in England.

Along with Father James Coigly, Arthur O'Connor, Benjamin Binns (of the London Corresponding Society) and Jeremiah Leary, he was tried for high treason at Maidstone in February 1798. The party had been arrested while attempting to make a Channel crossing to France. In Coigly's coat pocket had been found what proved to be the only admissible evidence of treason, an address from "The Secret Committee of England’" to the Directory of France. While its suggestion of a mass movement in England primed to welcome Napoleon, the "hero of Italy", was scarcely credible, it was proof of intent to invite and encourage a French invasion. Coigly refused the offer of his life in return for implicating Allen and his fellow defendants who were acquitted.

Following the suppression of the United Irish insurrection in the summer of 1798, Allen joined Robert Emmet in seeking to re-establish the republican organisation on strictly military lines. In 1800 he is said to have accompanied Emmet on a mission to Irish exiles in Cadiz.

In July 1803, an accidental explosion at one of their arms depots in Dublin forced them to declare themselves and attempt a seizure of the city. Allen led a rebel band, according to one witness of 300, but they failed to effect a conjunction with the command of Emmet and Myles Byrne in Thomas Street. Unaware of Allen's approach, Emmet ordered his men to disband, and the attempt to seize the city broke up in series of disorderly altercations.

Allen is said to have escaped Dublin in the uniform of the Trinity College Yeomanry corps, and to have been "put into a cask, carried to George's Quay and shipped for France".

== Irish Legionnaire ==
In France, Allen joined Myles Byrne in the Irish Legion, under the initial command – despite, as they noted, his complete lack of military experience – of Arthur O'Connor. After service in Spain, where he led a storming party in the capture of Astorga (1810) and was held captive by Spanish guerrillas (1811–12), he rose to the rank of chef-de-bataillon (lieutenant-colonel) (March 1814). He rallied to Napoleon during his hundred-day restoration in the spring of 1815. After the emperor's final defeat in June, the British government demanded Allen's surrender. While being conducted to the frontier, he made his escape, with the connivance of his guards, at the last station on French territory.

In November 1815, Allen was one of six Irish Legion officers, including Myles Byrne, accused by the Bourbon Restoration government of subversion, Bonapartism and even Jacobinism. With Byrne, he remonstrated successfully with the Minister of War and escaped deportation.

In retirement, Allen lived first at Tours near fellow legionnaireGeneral William Lawless and later at Caen in Normandy. In the early 1840s, Allen returned secretly to Ireland to bring his elderly sisters back to Caen. In his Memoirs Byrne records that Allen died at Caen on 10 February 1855 apparently unmarried, his property passing to his sisters. Dr Thomas Dromgoole, a leading member of the Catholic Board (precursor to Daniel O'Connell's Catholic Association), who met Allen in France in 1820, considered that he "was a man of such firmness of character that he would have been fit to fill the highest situation in Ireland".
