= Battle of Montenegro =

1838 battle between Argentina and Peru–Bolivia

- Part of the Tarija War
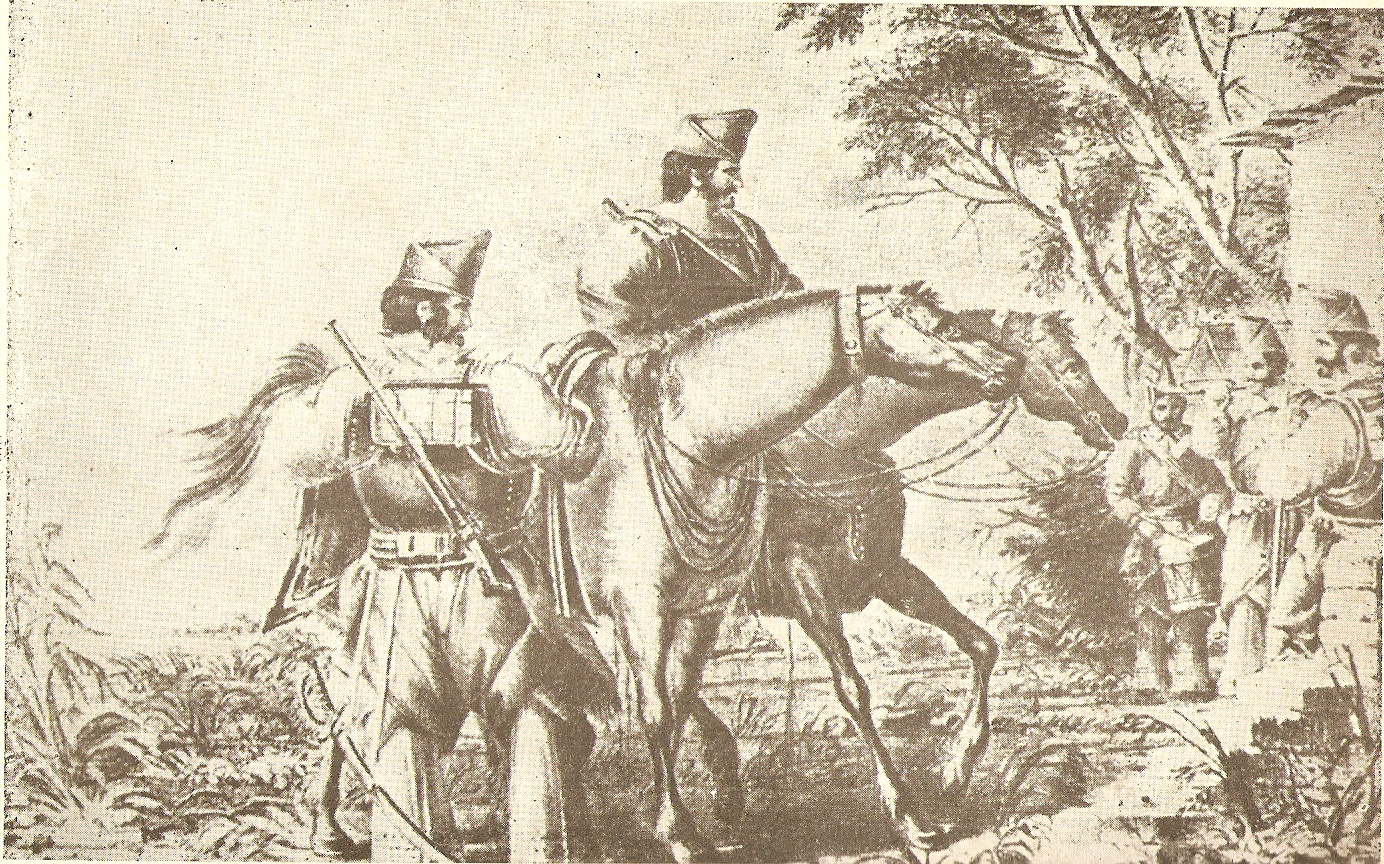
- Argentine cuirassiers at the time of the battle
Date	24 June 1838
Location	Montenegro - Cuyambuyo (now in Bolivia)
Result	Confederate victory • Occupation of Santa Catalina, Yavi, Santa Victoria, Cangrejillos, Abra Pampa, Cochinoca and Pastos Chicos.

Belligerents
Argentine Confederation	Peru–Bolivian Confederation

Commanders and leaders
Gregorio Paz	Otto P. Braun; F. Burdett O'Connor

Strength
750–800	260–1,900

Casualties and losses
250–300 casualties	10–300 killed 15–226 wounded

The Battle of Montenegro, also called the Battle of Cuyambuyo, was fought on 24 June 1838 as part of the Tarija War, between Argentina and the Peru–Bolivian Confederation.

The invading Argentine army was defeated by a force led by Otto Philipp Braun supported by Francisco Burdett O'Connor, settling the location of Bolivia's southwestern border.

== Background ==
Otto Philipp Braun, General Felipe Braun, was German in origin. In 1820 he joined the army of Simón Bolívar during the Spanish American wars of independence, rising to a senior position. He entered the service of Bolivian President Andrés de Santa Cruz in 1830. As a Divisional General he accompanied Santa Cruz in the June 1835 invasion of Peru, in which the Bolivia-Peru Confederation was formed. He was to lead the Bolivian troops to victory at Montenegro. Francis O'Connor was an Irish volunteer who became Bolívar's chief of staff in the "United Army of Liberation in Peru". In 1826 he was appointed military governor of the Bolivian town of Tarija.

Juan Manuel de Rosas was effective ruler of Argentina from 1829 until 1852. In 1837 Rosas entered an alliance with Chile against the confederation of Peru and Bolivia, declaring war on 19 May 1837. His motives were mixed, but the main one was a territorial dispute concerning the Province of Tarija. Another factor was the support given by Santa Cruz to Rosas' domestic enemies, the Unitarian faction. In the initial fighting, the Bolivians under General Felipe Braun entered Argentina and had a series of minor successes. Later in 1837 the Bolivians withdrew to their side of the border after a defeat at Humahuaca.

The Argentine forces were unable to follow up until they had dealt with the defection of the militia of Jujuy Province and with uprisings by Unitarian rebels, and had obtained reinforcements. In April 1838 the Argentines, with 1,000 men, invaded Bolivia and won minor engagements at Acambuco on 27 April, Zapatera on 2 May and Pajonal on 6 May. Argentine forces under Colonel Gregorio Paz moved to the San Luis valley near Tarija, arriving there on 10 June 1838.

According to an Argentine account, Paz was told by the border commander that General Braun had reached Tarija with a force of five hundred infantry and 50 cavalry. He was also told that the people of Tarija would support the Argentines. Based on this information, Paz decided to advance to the town of Tarija. By 24 June 1838 he was within 25 kilometres (16 mi) of his goal. The Bolivians took a stand at Montenegro hill.

== Battle ==
A Bolivian source says there were 260 Bolivian troops, tired after marching for 20 days through rough country, opposed to 800 Argentinians. The Argentine version says Bolivian forces numbered about 1,500 infantry and 400 cavalry, and the Argentinians had about 750 men in total. On 24 June 1838, the day of the battle, the Argentinians learned of the defeat of their compatriots in the Battle of Iruya, causing some of the infantry to desert. Paz decided to retreat through a narrow gorge, pursued by the Bolivians. He took a stand on the slope of Cuyambuyo. His main force was a rifle squadron, a company of Argentinian Cuirassiers and 150 infantry under the command of Lieutenant Colonel Manuel Ubierna.

At the start of the battle, the force of infantry from Puna defected to the Bolivians and fought against their former companions. The Bolivians charged several times, managing to divide the Argentinian force, but the struggle continued for 5 hours.

== Aftermath ==
Many of the Argentine troops were taken prisoner, and others were transferred to the Bolivian forces. As a result of the defeat, Gregorio Paz had to abandon his plan to take Tarija and advance to the border of Chuquisaca. Instead, he fled with his remaining forces to the Argentine headquarters at the fort of Zenta. After the defeat at Montenegro the Argentines withdrew to Jujuy Province. When the French declared war on Argentina in March 1838, operations against Bolivia were abandoned.

President Andrés de Santa Cruz awarded Braun the title of "Great Marshal of Montenegro". Until today Braun is the only foreigner ever to have gained this title in South America and the only marshal of Bolivia. Santa Cruz lost power in January 1839 after the Bolivian defeat by Chile in the Battle of Yungay, and Braun was forced to leave Bolivia.
