= Chronicles of Eri =

Purported ancient chronicle of the Irish published in English in 1822 by Roger O'Connor

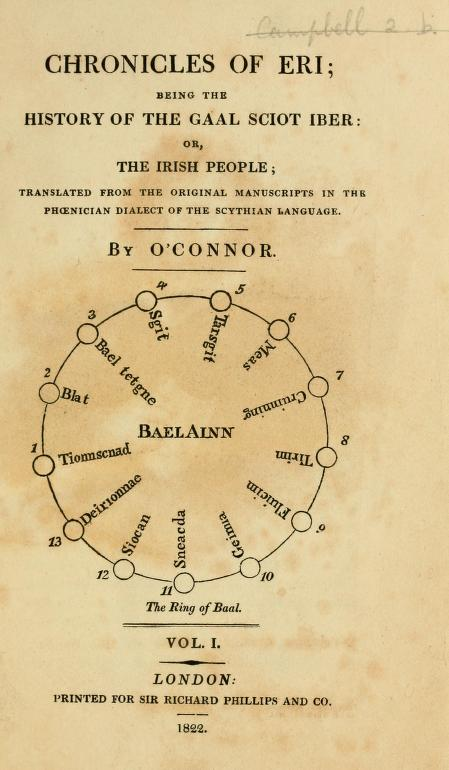
- Title page
- Author: Roger O'Connor
- Language: English
- Publication date: 1822

The Chronicles of Eri; Being the History of the Gaal Sciot Iber: or, the Irish People; Translated from the Original Manuscripts in the Phoenician Dialect of the Scythian Language is an 1822 book in two volumes by Roger O'Connor (1762–1834), purporting to detail the history of the Irish from the creation of the world. The work contains multiple plates and maps and is prefaced with the author naming himself "head of his race" and "chief of the prostrated people of this nation".

== Content ==
The book is in two volumes. The first volume describes the history of the Gaels from prehistory up to their departure from Spain. The second volume describes their conquest of Ireland. Throughout, the text is written as if it is from authentic ancient texts, the content of which is commented upon and explained in detailed footnotes written in O'Connor's own person.

=== Preface ===
The book begins with a letter to O'Connor's friend Francis Burdett, in which O'Connor describes alleged conspiracies against his life and his family, and refers to the military exploits of his son Francis Burdett O'Connor, named after his friend. He then predicts the honour with which Burdett's name will be remembered. A preface follows in which he speaks of the many trials he had in writing the book, which is a "literal translation into the English language (from the Phoenician dialect of the Scythian language) of the ancient manuscripts, which have, fortunately for the world, been preserved through many ages, chances and visissitudes".

=== Volume one ===
The first volume is presented as a translation of text written by "Eolus", who was "chief of the Gael-ag" from 1368-35 BC which is said to be fifty years after Moses. This describes the origin and migrations of the Gaels. According to this text, the Gaels originated among the Phoenicians, and migrated to Scythia and Sidon, where the people who would become the Ancient Britons split off from the group that would become the Gaels. They eventually migrated to Spain.

=== Volume two ===
The second volume describes the Gaels' conquest of Ireland. When the Egyptian king Sesostris invaded Spain, he sought to establish "idolatry", which the Gaels resisted. In 1006 BC, they sailed from Spain to Ireland and conquered the land. They brought with them other anti-Sesostris peoples from Spain. In Ireland they established a religion based on fire worship, in which the chief deities were Baal (identified with the Sun), and Re (identified with the Moon).

== Critical views ==
Of the supposed original Phoenician manuscripts, the only evidence O'Connor ever produced for examination was an 18 in (460 mm)-long scroll purporting to be "a facsimile of part of the great roll of the Laws of Eri", currently held in the John Rylands Library of the University of Manchester. Scholars who have examined this manuscript "are unable to find in them the likeness of any known ancient language". The rest O'Connor claimed were lost or destroyed in various circumstances.

R. A. Stewart Macalister dismissed the book as "an amalgam of bombastic paraphrases of Irish annalistic matter, irreverent parodies of Biblical excerpts, 'etymologies' (which have to be seen to be believed), and wildly irresponsible inventions resembling those in the closely analogous Book of Mormon." Alfred Webb in his A Compendium of Irish Biography (1878) was less charitable, deeming the Chronicles of Eri to be "a piece of gross literary forgery."
