= Tom Smith (author) =

American business executive and author

- Education: Brigham Young University
- Occupations: Executive, author

Tom Smith is an American business executive and author. He is the co-author of four best-selling books on the subject of workplace accountability, The Oz Principle, Change the Culture, Change the Game, How Did That Happen?, and The Wisdom of Oz.

== Career ==
Smith is co-founder of Partners In Leadership and is a New York Times bestselling author. He and his business partner, Roger Connors, have authored books on workplace accountability. Smith has conducted workshops and consulting engagements throughout the globe as he is recognized as an expert on the topic of workplace accountability. He is a facilitator of senior executive groups and management teams.

Smith co-authored the New York Times bestselling book, The Oz Principle: Getting Results through Individual and Organizational Accountability, ranked annually as one of the top five bestselling business books in the leadership and performance categories. He also co-authored the New York Times bestsellers How Did That Happen? Holding People Accountable for Results the Positive, Principled Way, Change the Culture, Change the Game: The Breakthrough Strategy for Energizing Your Organization and Creating Accountability for Results, and The Wisdom of Oz: Using Personal Accountability to Succeed in Everything You Do.

== Background ==
Smith is a member of the American Society for Training & Development. He holds an MBA from The Marriott School of Management at Brigham Young University and a Bachelor of Arts in humanities from the University of California, Irvine. He and his wife, Becky, have eight children and fifteen grandchildren.

== Bibliography ==
- Smith, Tom (with Connors, Roger) (2004). The Oz Principle: Getting Results Through Individual and Organizational Accountability. London: Portfolio. pp. 256 pages. ISBN 978-1591840244.
- Smith, Tom (with Connors, Roger) (2009). How Did That Happen?: Holding People Accountable for Results the Positive, Principled Way. London: Portfolio. pp. 272 pages. ISBN 978-1591842583.
- Smith, Tom (with Connors, Roger) (2011). Change the Culture, Change the Game: The Breakthrough Strategy for Energizing Your Organization and Creating Accountability for Results. London: Portfolio. pp. 240 pages. ISBN 978-1591843610.
- Smith, Tom (with Connors, Roger) (2014). The Wisdom of Oz: Using Personal Accountability to Succeed in Everything You Do. London: Portfolio. pp. 160 pages. ISBN 978-1591847151.
