= Tarija War =

War between Argentina and Peru–Bolivia

- Part of the War of the Confederation
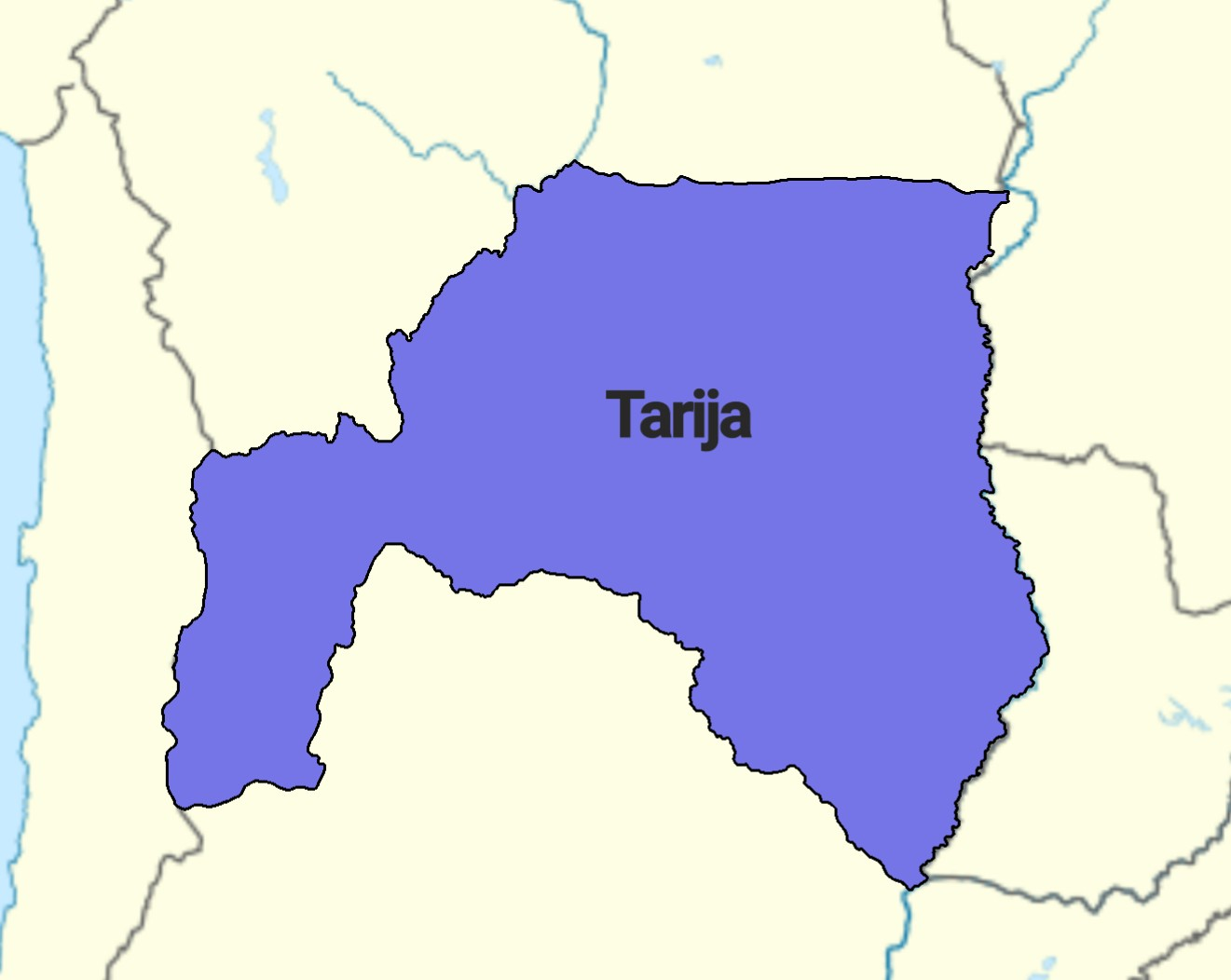
- Map of Tarija territory, whose dispute between Bolivia and Argentina was known as the Tarija Question
Date	May 19, 1837 – April 26, 1839
Location	Bolivian department of Tarija, and Argentine provinces of Jujuy and Salta (Argentina–Bolivia border)
Result	Inconclusive: Subsequent peace between the Argentine Confederation and Bolivia after the dissolution of the Peru–Bolivian Confederation; Bolivia returns the Argentine territories of the provinces of Jujuy and Salta that were occupied during the war

Belligerents
Argentine Confederation	Peru–Bolivian Confederation

Commanders and leaders
Juan M. de Rosas; Alejandro Heredia X Felipe Heredia; Pablo Alemán; Manuel Virto; Gregorio Paz	Otto P. Braun; F. Burdett O'Connor; Sebastián Ágreda; Timoteo Raña

Strength
Army of the North: 400 (1837); 3,500 (1838; ~1,000 in offensive in enemy territory); 5,000 gauchos from Jujuy	Confederate Army: 2,000–2,400 (1837); 2,000–4,000 (1838)

Argentinian territorial claims on Tarija in the 19th Century

The Tarija War (Spanish: Guerra por Tarija), also known as the War between Argentina and the Peru–Bolivian Confederation (Spanish: Guerra entre Argentina y la Confederación Perú-Boliviana), was an armed conflict that occurred between 1837 and 1839. Because it happened while the Peru–Bolivian Confederation was engaged in a parallel war against the Republic of Chile during the so-called War of the Confederation, both conflicts are often confused. The Tarija War began on May 19, 1837, when Juan Manuel de Rosas, who was in charge of managing foreign relations for the Argentine Confederation and was governor of the Province of Buenos Aires, declared war directly on President Andres de Santa Cruz because of the Tarija Question and Confederation's support for the Unitarian Party.

The operations began in August 1837, when Bolivian Confederate troops invaded most of the Province of Jujuy, the Puna de Jujuy, and the north of the Province of Salta. The war continued with a series of combats and skirmishes between both forces, all of them without conclusive results. In May and June 1838, the Confederate army defeated Rosas's troops in a series of engagements, the most important of which was the Battle of Montenegro, which in practice led to Argentina's withdrawal from the war, which from then on had a defensive posture being maintained, but the state of war continued until the victory of the Chilean-Peruvian restorative army at the Battle of Yungay, which put an end to the Peru-Bolivian Confederation.

== The question of the Unitarian Party ==
Relations between the Peru-Bolivian Confederation and the Argentine Confederation had deteriorated, among other reasons due to Bolivian President Andrés de Santa Cruz's support for members of the Unitarian Party that carried out at least four incursions from southern Bolivia to the northern Argentine provinces in the years before the war. One of them was that of Colonel Javier López in 1834, which culminated in his defeat in the Battle of Chiflón. A new attempt by López in 1835 was defeated at the Battle of Monte Grande, where he was shot. Also in 1835 Felipe Figueroa invaded the Province of Catamarca and in 1836 Mariano Vázquez, counting Bolivian forces among his ranks, attacked towns in Puno

In August 1835, Argentine forces entered Bolivian territory to arrest José Antonio Reinafé and Cornelio Moyano, which exacerbated border tensions.

Rosas suspected that Santa Cruz was using the Unitarians, in alliance with Uruguayan President Fructuoso Rivera, to seize the provinces of northwestern Argentina, since it had already done so in Peru. In September 1836, the Chilean confidential agent Francisco Javier Rosales showed Rosas documents in this regard, which confirmed the rumors that the unitary Juan Galo Lavalle was in negotiations with Santa Cruz to establish a state between Argentina and Bolivia.

== The possible Argentine-Chilean alliance ==
Persuaded by the minister Diego Portales, José Joaquín Prieto declared war on November 11, 1836, with the northern Peruvians opposed to Santa Cruz and its confederation. Portales communicated the declaration to Rosas and asked him to do the same by virtue of the tacit understanding between the two countries and reiterated the offer to sign an alliance treaty.

On December 28, 1836, Rosas wrote to the governor of Salta Felipe Heredia:

because Bolivians only live on the tribute of the Indians and what the Cerro and Casa de Moneda de Potosí produce (...) and the seizure of that Villa assures me that it is not a company of great difficulty (...) it owes us the millions of pesos that we have spent for their freedom and independence in the war against the Spaniards (…) and they owe us the Argentine blood that has been spilled in this war (…) Understand that, once Tarija has been restored, the Suypacha River will have to divide the territory of both republics; But it seems to me that if we can ensure that the Villa de Tupiza and the town of Santiago de Cotagaita remain within our territory, it will be the best and most important thing to ensure peace and free trade between both States forever, with all the advantages that I have indicated. In exchange for doing this good I think we could forgive the expenses made in the War of Independence and also the benefits that they have taken from Tarija in all the time it has been usurped. But to obtain all these things it will be necessary to penetrate to the Capital of Bolivia, and have the Cerro de Potosí for us. Such an important acquisition must be at work with the exclusion of the Salteños and Jujeños

On February 13, 1837, there was a border incident when a Bolivian party entered Argentine territory in the Cochinoca area in search of Colonel José Cáceres, who was recruiting soldiers and they arrested him.

On the same February 13, Rosas declared closed all commercial, epistolary, and other communication between the inhabitants of the Argentine Confederation and those of Peru and Bolivia, declaring anyone who crossed the border into those countries "traitor to the homeland", which generated warlike demonstrations in Buenos Aires the next day. Both confederations did not have formal diplomatic relations, so the declaration was intended to show the rupture of relations between the two countries.

On February 21, Rosas communicated to Chile the bases on which the Argentine Confederation would sign an alliance:

1. The war would not be against the peoples of Peru and Bolivia, but rather against Santa Cruz, who would be forced to evacuate Peru;
2. Santa Cruz would not be allowed to remove armies or armaments from Peru and the Bolivian army should be reduced to maintaining internal order;
3. Tarija would be restored to Argentina, Chile would receive compensation for Freire's pronouncement, and Argentina for the expenses of the war of independence and the unitary incursions;
4. Bolivia and Peru should grant Argentina and Chile favorable trade conditions and adjust limits with them.

Portales was upset by the delay in the declaration of war by Rosas and did not accept to include in the alliance the restitution of Tarija nor the compensation for the damages caused by the Unitarians from Bolivia, because the Government of Chile had not participated in these matters. Consequently, the treaty of alliance was suspended, but a de facto alliance was agreed, so that Rosas would declare war on Santa Cruz and not on the Peruvian states.

== Development of the Conflict ==
Although Argentina officially declared war in 1836, the military actions did not occur until 1837. On May 16, 1837, Rosas designated Alejandro Heredia as "General in Chief of the Confederate Argentine Army of Operations against the tyrant General Santa Cruz."

On May 19, 1837, Rosas declared that "the Argentine Confederation is at war with the government of Santa Cruz, and its supporters," without waiting for the pronouncement of the other provinces. Santa Cruz had appointed Otto Philipp Braun as commander of operations in the south, seconded by Generals Francisco Burdett O'Connor, Sebastián Ágreda and Timoteo Raña. Braun's barracks were established in Tupiza where an army that did not exceed 2,400 men was concentrated, almost all of them from Chicheños and Tarijeños, distributed in the following units: 1st Battalion of “La Guardia”, 5th line, 6th “Socabaya”, 8th of "Nationals", with 300, 380, 700 and 600 infantry men respectively; Regiment "Guides de la Guardia" and Regiment 2º de "Nacionales", both cavalry with a total of 4 squadrons, 2 of them hunters, 1 cuirassiers and 1 guides. The artillery had a brigade with 4 pieces under the command of Commander García.

On June 24, 1837, the Battle of Montenegro occurs, in the vicinity of Padcaya. Paz thad to withdraw to Argentine territory, being continually harassed by Bolivian troops. In this battle the Bolivians captured 20 Argentine officers.

== End of the War ==
Santa Cruz annexed to Bolivia the Argentine territory of the Puna de Jujuy in which the populations of Santa Catalina, Yavi, Santa Victoria, Cangrejillos, Pueso, Abra Pampa, Cochinoca, Pastos Chicos, and others are found. He placed it under the dependency of the Department of Tarija and appointed Bolivian authorities, among whom were Timoteo Raña, Sebastián Agreda and Bernardo Trigo.

However, on January 20, 1839, the restorative forces of the Chilean Manuel Bulnes and the Peruvian Agustín Gamarra achieved the victory of Yungay against Santa Cruz during the War of the Confederation, which put an end to the Peru-Bolivian Confederation. On February 14, 1839, General Velasco, the new president of Bolivia, informed the governor of Jujuy of the end of the state of war and showed himself willing to negotiate the problem of Tarija. On April 26, 1839, General Rosas officially put an end to the war without taking advantage of the defeat of Santa Cruz to advance on Tarija, allowing them to decide the issue. They remained on the Bolivian side. The territory of the Puna de Jujuy, Iruya and other occupied populations were returned by Bolivia in March 1839.
