= Victor Bulmer-Thomas =

British academic

Victor Bulmer-Thomas CMG OBE (born 23 March 1948) is a British academic who has specialised in Latin America and the Caribbean. Born in London, his first experience of the Americas was as a V.S.O. in Belize (1966/7), where he taught several of the future leaders of the country. He studied at New College, Oxford University for his undergraduate degree, where he obtained a first. In 1975 he graduated with a DPhil from St Antony's College, Oxford, with an original dissertation on Costa Rica where he pioneered the concept of constructing databases from primary sources and applying them to Latin American economic history. While at university, he became involved in left-wing student politics.

== Academic career ==
=== Early years in Scotland ===
His first academic post was at the Fraser of Allander Institute for Research on the Scottish Economy at the University of Strathclyde in Glasgow. He was one of the first to be appointed to this new Institute, where he worked with a team of economists building a model of the Scottish economy that required the construction of an input-output model. While at the institute, he also worked as a consultant to the Moroccan government. where he applied his knowledge and use of input-output tables.

His first published works were on the Scottish economy, including a study of the household savings rate and the Scottish balance of payments on the eve of oil production. However, his experience in the field of input-output analysis (he also built an input-output table for Guatemala) led to the publication of his first book with a foreword by the Nobel laureate Wassily Leontief (Input-Output Analysis for Developing Countries: Sources, Methods and Applications, 1982).

=== London ===
He moved from Scotland in 1978 to take up a post as lecturer in Development Economics at Queen Mary College (now Queen Mary) at London University. Here he undertook research on Latin America and was invited to take part in a study group on Latin America in the 1930s. Working on Central America, he found it necessary to construct the national accounts for the five countries of the region from 1920 onwards. This led to the publication in 1987 of The Political Economy of Central America since 1920.

He was the guest editor of a special issue of the Journal of Latin American Studies on Central America published in 1983, and he joined the editorial board in 1984 – a post he held without interruption for 25 years. From 1986 to 1997 he was also editor of the Journal of Latin American Studies. In 1988 he launched a Masters in Economics with special reference to Latin America at Queen Mary, which attracted many students from the region. In 1988 he became Reader in Economics of Latin America, the first person to hold that title in the United Kingdom, and in 1990 he was promoted to Professor of Economics. Two years later, he became the Director of London University's Institute of Latin American Studies, although he remained attached to Queen Mary. During his six years as Director, the Institute flourished and received a 5* (the highest ranking) in the Research Assessment Exercise. It was during this time as Director that he published his best known book The Economic History of Latin America since Independence. This has now been translated into Spanish, Japanese and Chinese and went into a third edition in 2014. While Director, he received honours from the governments of Brazil and Colombia as well as an OBE from the British government in recognition of his role in building up the reputation of the institute.

He retired as Director in 1998, but remained on the staff of the Institute of Latin American Studies as Senior Research Fellow. It was during this time that he began to take an interest in the economic history of the Caribbean. However, this research was interrupted when he became the Director of Chatham House, the London home of the Royal Institute of International Affairs in 2001. Whilst at Chatham House, he introduced the Chatham House Prize, an annual award presented to a leading international statesperson He supervised the first award in 2005 and, importantly, set the template that has ensured its ongoing success. Having by then published 20 books as sole author or editor, including the two volume Cambridge Economic History of Latin America, he was content to let research take a back seat while he concentrated on reviving the fortunes of Chatham House. He stepped down as Director of Chatham House in 2006, receiving a CMG from the British government in recognition of his achievements.

After leaving Chatham House at the end of 2006, he became a visiting professor at Florida International University where he worked on an economic history of the Caribbean since the Napoleonic Wars. On returning to the UK, he worked on the theme of the United States as an empire. His book, Empire in Retreat: the Past, Present and Future of the United States, was published in 2018.

He is currently professor emeritus of London University, Senior Distinguished Fellow of the School of Advanced Studies at London University, Honorary Professor of the Institute of the Americas at University College London, Associate Fellow in the United States and Americas Programme at Chatham House. He is married to Barbara Swasey from Belize (they have been married since 1970) and they have three children. His hobbies include playing quartets, underwater photography, kayaking, walking and tennis.

== Awards ==
- Companion of the Order of St Michael and St George
- Officer of the Order of the British Empire
- Order of San Carlos, Colombia (1998)
- Order of the Southern Cross, Brazil (1998)

== Publications ==
=== Books and monographs ===
- Internal Empire: The Rise and Fall of English Imperialism, London, C. Hurst (Publishers), 2023.
- From Slavery to Services: the Struggle for Economic Independence in the Caribbean, Kingston, Ian Randle Publishers, 2021
- Empire in Retreat: the Past, Present and Future of the United States, New Haven and London, Yale University Press, 2018
- The Economic History of Latin America since Independence, Cambridge, Cambridge University Press, 2014 (third edition)
- The Economic History of the Caribbean since the Napoleonic Wars, Cambridge, Cambridge University Press, 2012
- (with Barbara Bulmer-Thomas), The Economic History of Belize: from 17th Century to Post-Independence, Cubola, Belize, 2012
- (editor with John Coatsworth and Roberto Cortés Conde), The Economic History of Latin America, "Vol. 1. The Colonial Era and the Short 19th Century", Cambridge University Press (2006)
- (editor with John Coatsworth and Roberto Cortés Conde), The Economic History of Latin America, "Vol. 2. The Long 20th Century", Cambridge University Press (2006)
- (editor), Regional Integration in Latin America and the Caribbean: the Political Economy of Open Regionalism, ILAS, 2001
- (editor with James Dunkerley), The United States and Latin America: the New Agenda, ILAS and Harvard University, 1999
- (editor), Integración Regional en Centroamérica, San José, FLACSO, 1998
- Reflexiones sobre la Integración Centroamericana, Banco Centroamericano de Integración Económica, 1997
- (editor) Thirty Years of Latin American Studies in the United Kingdom; London: Institute of Latin American Studies, 1997
- (editor) The New Economic Model in Latin America and its Impact on Income Distribution and Poverty, Macmillan/ILAS, 1996. (Spanish edition published by Trimestre Económico in Mexico)
- (co-editor with Mónica Serrano) Rebuilding the State: Mexico after Salinas, Institute of Latin American Studies, 1996 (Spanish edition published by Fondo de Cultura Económica in Mexico)
- (co-editor with D'Alva Kinzo, M.) Growth and Development in Brazil: Cardoso's Real Challenge, Institute of Latin American Studies, 1995
- The Economic History of Latin America since Independence, Cambridge, Cambridge University Press, 1994. (Spanish edition published by Fondo de Cultura Económica in Mexico in 1998; Japanese edition published by Nagoya University in 2001; Chinese edition forthcoming)
- (co-editor with N.Craske and M. Serrano), Mexico and the North American Agreement: Who will Benefit?, Macmillan, 1994. A Spanish version was published as Mexico Frente al TLC: Costos y Beneficios, Colegio de México, 1995
- (editor and coauthor), Central American Integration, Report for the Commission of the European Community, University of Miami, 1992
- (with Malcolm Deas et al.), Latin America in Perspective, Boston: Houghton Mifflin, 1991
- (editor) Britain and Latin America: A Changing Relationship, Royal Institute of International Affairs and Cambridge University Press, 1989
- Studies in the Economics of Central America, London: MacMillan; New York: St. Martins Press, 1988
- The Political Economy of Central America since 1920, Cambridge University Press, 1987. A Spanish version (La Economía Política de América Central desde 1920) was published by the Banco Centroamericano de Integración Económica, Tegucigalpa, Honduras, in 1989
- Latin American Debt: Origins, Policies and Prospects, London: Latin American Newsletters, 1987
- Input Output Analysis: Sources, Methods and Applications for Developing Countries. London: John Wiley, 1982. (With a Foreword written by Professor Wassily Leontief)
- Income, Expenditure and the Balance of Payments in Scotland. Glasgow: Fraser of Allander Institute, Research Monograph No. 6, 1978

== See also ==
- Ivor Bulmer-Thomas Victor's father
