= The Oz Principle =

1994 book by Roger Connors, Tom Smith, Craig Hickman

- First edition
- Author: Roger Connors; Tom Smith; Craig Hickman
- Language: English
- Genre: Management
- Publisher: Prentice Hall
- Publication date: 1994
- Publication place: United States
- Media type: Print
- Pages: 232
- ISBN: 9781591843481

The Oz Principle: Getting Results Through Individual and Organizational Accountability is a leadership book written by Roger Connors, Tom Smith, and Craig Hickman. It was first published in 1994.

The book, which borrows its title from The Wonderful Wizard of Oz, discusses accountability and results.

== Content overview ==
The Oz Principle examines the role of accountability in the achievement of business results and the improvement of both individual and organizational performance. The Oz Principle presents a new understanding and a paradigm shift in how accountability is understood. The Oz Principle defines accountability as “a personal choice to rise above one’s circumstances and demonstrate the ownership necessary for achieving desired results to See It, Own It, Solve It, and Do It.” The book is organized around the Steps To Accountability model, which shows how to create both individual and organization accountability for achieving results. The model is divided in half by a line that “separates success from failure," with Above The Line being the area of "accountability and success" and Below The Line being the area "self-victimization and failure."

== Reception and recognition ==
The Oz Principle is one of the top five bestselling books in the Leadership and Performance categories since 1994, and for the last 15 years it has been in the top 30 bestselling books. It is also a New York Times, Wall Street Journal, USA Today, and Publishers Weekly bestselling book. In addition, it was selected as a Top 5 Book Pick by the Banff Centre, which focuses on leadership development, as well as being called "a must read" by the Business Book Bestseller List in their February 2013 list.
