= Roderic O'Connor (land commissioner) =

Australian politician

- Born: Roderic O'Connor; 1784; County Clare
- Died: 1860 (aged 75–76); Connorsville, Cressy, Tasmania
- Occupation: Tasmanian colonial official
- Years active: 1824–1836

Roderic O'Connor (1784–1860) was an Irish Australian landowner and public official, most notable for his activities as a land commissioner in Tasmania. He became one of the biggest landowners in Tasmania, and oversaw the modernisation of the land, typically using the forced labour of convicts.

O'Connor was notorious for his combative personality, and was constantly involved in verbal and legal feuding with local rivals, resulting in several court cases.

== Early life ==
O'Connor was the oldest son of Roger O'Connor, an Irish nationalist who held extremely unorthodox views on history and religion. Roderic was named from Ruaidrí Ua Conchobair (Roderick O'Connor) the last High King of Ireland, from whom his father claimed lineal descent. He grew up in Dangan Castle, the childhood home of Arthur Wellesley, 1st Duke of Wellington. His mother Louisa died shortly after his birth. He had two notable half-brothers by his father's second wife: the Chartist leader Feargus O'Connor and the Irish-Bolivian general Francisco Burdett O'Connor. At one point Feargus and Francisco stole two of Roderic's horses in order to sell them and get away to London.

== Van Diemen's Land ==
O'Connor had managed his father's estate in Ireland. In 1817 his father was accused of conspiring with his estate workers to rob a mail coach. He was put on trial. Though he was acquitted, the events created ill feeling towards the O'Connor family, which persisted after the trial. Roderic took the opportunity to visit Hobart in Van Diemen's Land (now called Tasmania) in the year of the trial. He emigrated there permanently in 1824, bringing with him his two illegitimate sons William and Arthur. He quickly acquired 1000 acres of land, which he improved with new buildings, and rapidly expanded his holdings, becoming one of the biggest landowners in Tasmania. He eventually owned or controlled over 70,000 acres of land.

=== Public official ===
O'Connor's skill in land management and engineering recommended him to the Lieutenant-Governor Sir George Arthur, who appointed him land commissioner, overseeing the organisation, codification and improvement of territory in Van Diemen's Land, a subject to which O'Connor devoted himself with great energy. He was the most active of the three commissioners. A number of Tasmanian place names are likely due to his influence, including the town of Longford. Having completed this task, he was appointed inspector of roads and bridges. He was responsible for building the Bridgewater causeway among other thoroughfares. O'Connor made great use of convict labour, both on his own land and in his road building schemes. He was a strong supporter of continuing the system of penal transportation. Like other settlers, he also had a low opinion of the native Aboriginal Tasmanians, saying it would be "a disgrace...to the human race to call [them] men." Supporting Arthur's policy of creating a Black Line to segregate Tasmanians he wrote, "Can we live in a wilderness surrounded by wretches who watch every opportunity and who take delight in shedding our blood?"

He retired from public service in 1836, after Arthur left office.

== Controversies ==
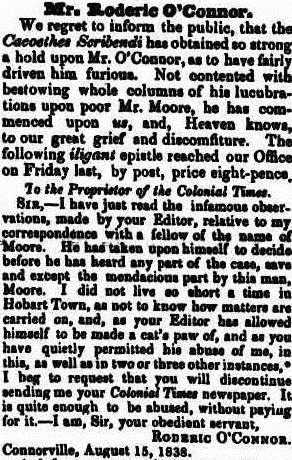
One of O'Connor's letters, with satirical preamble by the editors of The Colonial Times

O'Connor became notorious for his quarrelsome and litigious behaviour, pursuing public disputes in the pages of local newspapers. In 1830 Dudley Fereday, the local sheriff and moneylender, sued O'Connor for libel after O'Connor had publicly denounced him for committing perjury when his business practices were examined in a court case. Fereday sued for £5000 damages. Joseph Gellibrand, O'Connor's lawyer, gave "a detailed account of Fereday as the prince of usurers, lending money at 35 per cent interest". Fereday won damages of £400, but his reputation was undermined.

There was a long-running dispute between O'Connor and former colleague Joseph Henry Moore, which was played out in a series of letters in the Hobart Town Courier and The Colonial Times. It later came to court when Moore sued for libel. O'Connor accused Moore of having obtained land by corrupt means. After O'Connor wrote a letter cancelling his subscription to the paper, The Colonial Times satirically referred to him as "Don Roderic", with reference to his claim to descended from the kings of Ireland, and ridiculed the "scurrility and abuse" to which he resorted. In the end Moore won damages from the court of 40 shillings on two counts. However the jury added that "Mr. Moore had improper and illegal possession" of the land, but had not obtained it by "dishonourable means".

== Assessments ==
Jane Franklin, the wife of George Arthur's successor John Franklin, described him as "a man of immense estate ... bound by ties of I know not what nature to the Arthur faction ... but ... a man of blasted reputation, of exceedingly immoral conduct and of viperous tongue and pen". Robert Hughes describes him as a "tough, outspoken, pragmatic and arrogant" man, who was "very much feared".

Though brought up as an unbeliever, shortly before his death he converted to Roman Catholicism. According to James Dunkerley his descendant, also called Roderic, has "preserved a family tradition by occupying in Cressy a house called 'Connorville' after the original family estate in County Cork".
