= Pedro Antonio Olañeta =

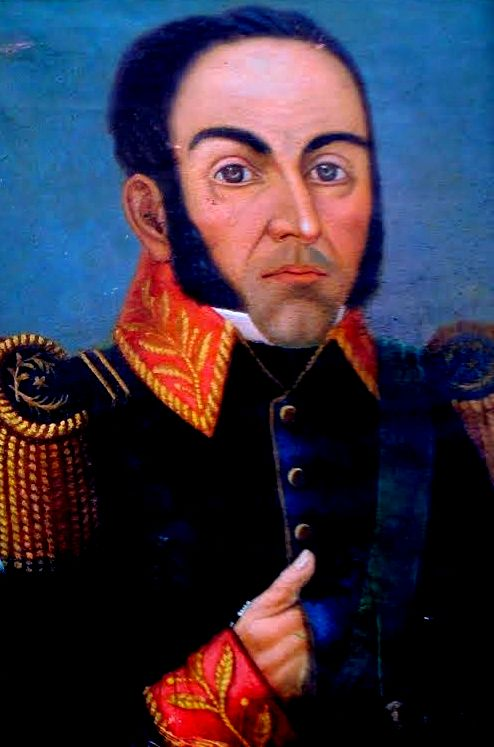
Pedro Antonio Olañeta

Pedro Antonio de Olañeta y Marquiegui (October 16, 1770 in Elgueta, Gipuzkoa, Spain – April 2, 1825 in Tumusla, Potosí Department, Bolivia) was a Royalist commander in the army of the Spanish Empire who fought against the South American insurgency led by Simón Bolívar. His support for Spanish absolutism and rebellion against the moderate Royalists created conflicts within the Royalist army that aided the rebels. After the defeat of the main Royalist armies, he continued the resistance, becoming one of the last Royalist commanders to hold out. Olañeta was the last Viceroy of the Río de la Plata.

== Early life ==
Olañeta was born in a small mountain village in the Biscay province, Spain. His family actively engaged in the colonial trade, and several of his uncles and cousins established themselves in Chuquisaca, Tupiza and Cusco, creating a vast trade network. In 1789 he emigrated to South America with his uncle Pedro Marquegui, a merchant trading the route between Cádiz and La Plata via Buenos Aires. Olañeta settled in the area of Potosí and Salta, becoming a prosperous trader. In 1803 he became Sargent Mayor in the Cavalry of the urban militia of Santiago de Cotagaita, Potosi province. When the war of independence broke out he was promoted to Brigadier General.

== Royalist commander ==
When the May Revolution occurred in 1810 he sided with the Royalists, commanded by General José Manuel de Goyeneche, and fought as an officer in campaigns against the rebels. He was promoted to colonel under the command of Joaquín Pezuela, then to brigadier general under Viceroy José de la Serna e Hinojosa in 1821. On 2 August 1822, he was awarded the Cross of San Fernando 3rd Class for his victory at the battle of Venta y Media.

After the liberal revolution in Spain under Fernando VII, Olañeta rejected the authority of La Serna and proclaimed himself "the only defender of throne and altar". Olañeta then ordered an attack of the Upper Peruvian royalists on the constitutionalists in the Peruvian viceroyalty. The Viceroy de La Serna was forced to change his plans of going down to the coast to fight Bolívar and sent Jerónimo Valdés with a force of 5,000 veterans to cross the Desaguadero River, which took place on January 22, 1824, in order to drive them to Potosí against his former subordinate "because there are indications of a meditated treason, joining the dissidents of Buenos Aires". Memorias para la historia de las armas españolas en el Perú ("Memories for the history of the Spanish armies in Peru") by peninsular official Andrés García Camba (1846) detailed the radical change that the events in Upper Peru produced in the viceroy's defensive plans. After a long campaign in the battles of Tarabuquillo, Sala, Cotagaita, and finally La Lava on August 17, 1824, both royalists forces of Viceroyalty Peru (liberals) and of the provinces of Upper Peru (absolutists) were decimated.

== Continuing resistance ==
Bolivar, having news of Olañeta's actions, took advantage of the dismantling of the royalist defensive system so that he "moved the whole month of May to Jauja", and faced José de Canterac, who was isolated in Junín on August 6 of 1824. Unrelenting prosecution of the war started, with the consequent desertion of 2700 royalists, who immediately went over to the independentists. Finally, October 7 of 1824, having his troops right in front of the doors of Cusco, Bolívar gave general Sucre the command of the new battle front, which followed the course of the Apurímac River, and he withdrew to Lima in order to negotiate more loans to keep the war going in Peru, and to receive a Colombian division of 4000 men provided by Páez, which arrived after the Battle of Ayacucho, where the patriot forces won the day.

After the decisive defeat of the main royalist armies in the Battle of Ayacucho, Olañeta continued a hopeless resistance against Simón Bolívar's forces in the Campaign of Sucre in Upper Peru (today's Bolivia). On April 2, 1825, after a desperate fight, Olañeta was mortally wounded in the Battle of Tumusla, fighting with a few hundred men against many of his own ex-troops led by Colonel Carlos Medinaceli, who had defected to the patriots. He died the following day. This battle of the war of independence was the last engagement in an open field by regular armies in South America. Unaware of his death, Fernando VII appointed him Viceroy of the Rio de la Plata. After the battle Antonio José de Sucre called a congress of Upper Peru and saw the creation of a new nation, Bolivia.

== Honors ==
1820: Cross of Commander of the Order of Isabel the Catholic.

1822: Cross of San Fernando, 3rd class.
