= Roger O'Connor =

Irish nationalist and writer (1762–1834)

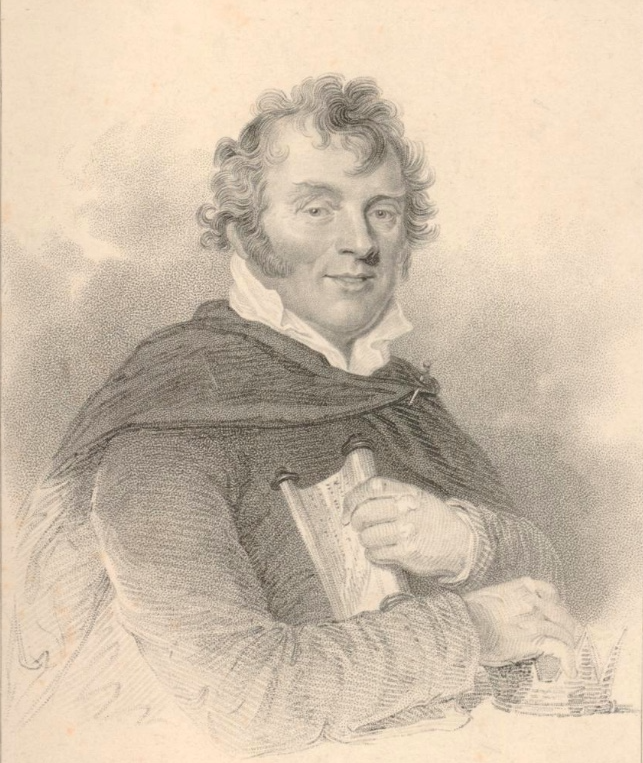
- Roger O'Connor, as depicted on the frontispiece to the Chronicles of Eri.
- Born: 1762; Connorville, County Cork, Ireland
- Died: 1834 (aged 71–72); Kilcrea
- Occupations: Polemicist; speculative historian
- Spouse(s): Louisa Strachan; Wilhamena Bowen
- Children: Louise O'Connor; Roderic O'Connor; Wilhelmina O'Connor; Francisco Burdett O'Connor; Arthur O'Connor; Mary O'Connor; Harriet O'Connor; Feargus O'Connor; George O'Connor
- Relatives: Arthur O'Connor (brother)
- Writing career
- Period: Romantic era

Roger O'Connor (1762–1834) was an Irish nationalist and writer, known for the controversies surrounding his life and writings, notably his fanciful history of the Irish people, the Chronicles of Eri. He was the brother of the United Irishman Arthur O'Connor, and the father of the Chartist leader Feargus O'Connor and of Francisco Burdett O'Connor who was to fight in the Spanish American wars of independence.

== Early life ==
O'Connor was born in Connorville, County Cork, into an Irish Protestant family. He studied law and was called to the bar in 1784. He married Louisa Anna Strachan, who died after giving birth to two children, Louise and Roderic. He remarried in 1788, to Wilhelmina Bowen, who bore him four sons and three daughters.

Roger's younger brother Arthur O'Connor was one of the United Irishmen. Roger was himself associated with the movement, editing the nationalist journal Harp of Erin. His two other brothers, Daniel and Robert, were firm loyalists and, after 1800, Irish unionists. After his oldest brother Daniel got into debt, Roger bought out his inheritance for £5.000. These political and financial conflicts were deepened by a family dispute following the suicide of his sister Anne, who had not been allowed by the family to marry a Catholic man she was in love with. This led to a long feud between Roger and his brother Robert. According to historian James Dunkerley Robert, who was the local sheriff, "even tried to have Roger executed" for treason because of his involvement with Harp of Erin.

Roger and Arthur engaged in nationalist activities in London, building a network of contacts along with Jane Greg who was to return as an active "United Irishwoman" to Belfast. Roger went into hiding in the run-up to the abortive 1796 rebellion. He subsequently surrendered to the authorities and was released. In July 1797 he assisted in the defence of other accused persons. According to Roger, this act led to further plots against him led by his loyalist brother Robert. He and Arthur were arrested and held in various locations over a period of several years before being finally released. Though an avowed Irish nationalist, O'Connor denied that he had ever been party to treasonable conspiracies. In 1799 he published To the People of Great Britain and Ireland, a booklet that detailed what he considered to be his mistreatment. The O'Connors received considerable support from Whig politicians in Britain. MP and playwright Richard Brinsley Sheridan wrote that "the usage of Roger O'Connor, who is one of the finest fellows I ever saw, has been merciless beyond example". O'Connor was held in Fort George near Inverness until 1801, when he was moved to London, but was barred from travelling to Ireland.

== Dangan ==
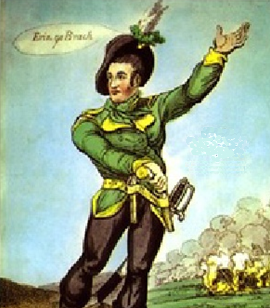
Caricature, said by Jane Hayter Hames to depict O'Connor saying "Erin go bragh" ("Ireland forever")

In 1803 O'Connor was finally allowed to return to Ireland. Following these troubles, O'Connor moved to Dangan Castle, Summerhill, County Meath having acquired the property on a permanently renewable lease from Thomas Burrowes of the East India Company. The castle had been the childhood home of Arthur Wellesley, who later became the Duke of Wellington. O'Connor asserted that he had acquired it as "a suitable residence in which to entertain Napoleon" after the anticipated success of Napoleon's planned invasion of the United Kingdom. At this time he began his career as a writer, preparing commentaries on the Old Testament. He did so from a position of scepticism towards religion; he once said Voltaire was his God.

His wife Wilhelmina died in 1806. After her death O'Connor's behaviour apparently became increasingly eccentric and extravagant. In 1809 a large part of the Castle was destroyed by fire. O'Connor was suspected of insurance fraud, as he had recently taken out a policy on the house. Many years later his son Francis (then known as Francisco) wrote in his autobiography that he had accidentally started the fire himself when melting lead to make bullets.

In 1817 O'Connor and his son Arthur were arrested on a charge of having organised a mail robbery five years earlier, during which a guard was shot and killed. Two of the robbers had been apprehended after attempting to pass some of the stolen property, and had implicated O'Connor. The robbers were labourers employed on O'Connor's estate. It was alleged that O'Connor's steward Martin McKeon had conspired with him to organise the robbery, with McKeon recruiting the robbers. O'Connor was allegedly motivated by debt. Both men were put on trial. Arthur was also arrested, but later released. O'Connor stated that his only connection to the robbery was that his son had found the abandoned mailbags on his land. An endorsement of O'Connor's moral character was given by O'Connor's close friend the MP Sir Francis Burdett, who stated that he was happy to lend any sum of money to O'Connor. O'Connor and McKeon were both acquitted, as the accusers' evidence was not considered credible. O'Connor and his supporters pointed out that the robbers had been spared the death penalty for testifying against him. O'Connor published his version of events, in which he argued that there had been a conspiracy to have him convicted. He claimed this was only the most recent of ten conspiracies to kill him, "being the first against my character—the tenth against my life in the past twenty-four years". Its real purpose was to destroy his reputation among the local people who "adored" him:

Charged with a highway robbery, in custody of a single constable, I ride through my own country thronged with a population that adored me — this is my crime,— this is the genuine source of all the plots and conspiracies formed against my life and character.

O'Connor's later attempt to sue one of the accusers for perjury brought out details of events on the night of the robbery that led to continued suspicion against him. Local support was also undermined when he was cross-examined about his religious views, and asserted that the Bible was not a divine revelation. John P. Prendergast, in an article on O'Connor, says that "thenceforth Roger O'Connor stood condemned in public opinion of the robbery for the Galway mail". Shortly after these events O'Connor's landlord attempted to get him evicted from Dangan, but the attempt failed. Nevertheless, O'Connor left the property and moved to Paris. It was later alleged by McKeon's son that the robbery was a cover for the interception of compromising letters written by Burdett to a married lover. This was supposed to explain Burdett's support of O'Connor.

While these events were unfolding, O'Connor's teenage sons Feargus and Francis fled the family home, travelled to London and asked to be looked after by Francis Burdett. Burdett took them in. O'Connor's oldest son Roderic moved to Australia.

== Chronicles of Eri ==
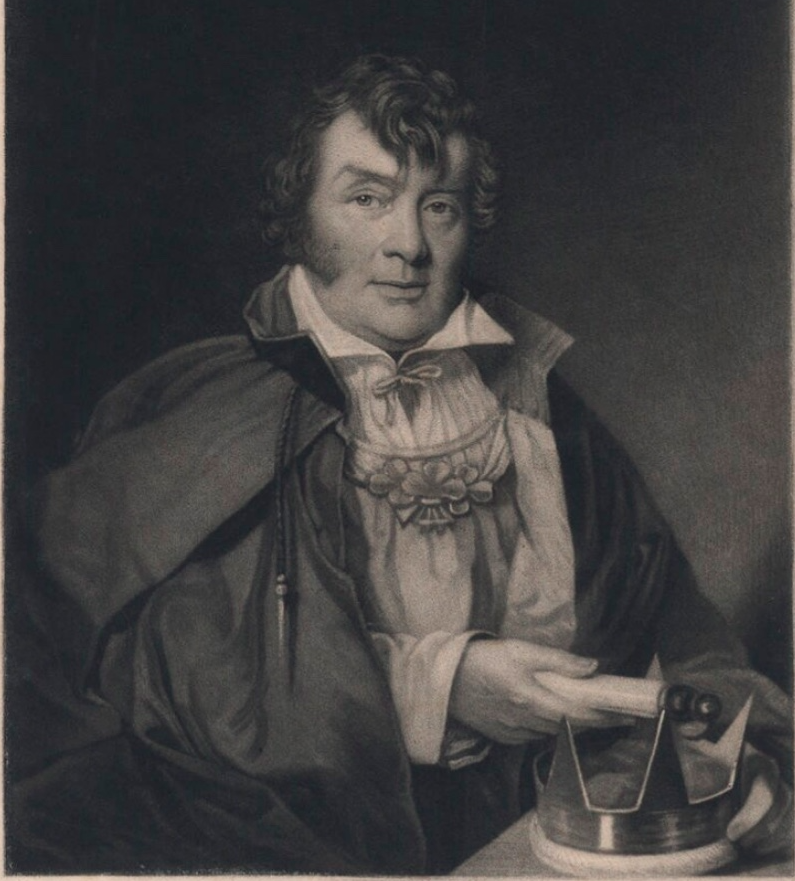
O'Connor depicted by Abraham Wivell, holding a crown signifying his claim to be the rightful king of Ireland

While in Paris, O'Connor prepared his best-known work, the Chronicles of Eri (1822), a book purporting to be a translation of ancient manuscripts detailing the early history of the Irish people. It was dedicated to his friend and supporter Sir Francis Burdett. The book was prefaced by a portrait of O'Connor holding a crown, the caption to which proclaimed that he was the "Head of his Race" and "Chief of the prostrated people of his nation", a position he claimed as the supposed lineal descendant of the 12th-century king Ruaidrí Ua Conchobair.

According to O'Connor, he had attempted to write this book three times before, but had been frustrated by the machinations of his enemies, who stole his manuscripts. Another version of the book had been destroyed in the disastrous fire at Dangan in 1809.

The book gives a history of the Gaels from supposed records written by "Eolus", who is said to have lived fifty years after Moses. It claims a continuous existence of the Gaelic people, originating among the ancient Phoenicians, migrating to Scythia, Spain and then Ireland. O'Connor interpreted Biblical stories and medieval Irish lore to support this narrative. William John Fitzpatrick in the Dictionary of National Biography stated that the book is "mainly, if not entirely, the fruit of O'Connor's imagination".

== Last years ==
O'Connor returned to county Cork, but by this time had lost much of his money. He lived for the rest of his life in a fisherman's cottage in Ballincollig, cohabiting with a local young woman he called the "princess of Kerry". According to Richard Robert Madden, O'Connor genuinely believed that this "young girl of humble origin" was really a princess: "The enthusiasm with which he is said to have been wont to speak of the exalted claims of this princess of Kerry to an ancient Irish regal origin, left no doubt on the minds of many who heard him expatiate on this subject, that he had worked himself up into a firm belief in his fondly-imagined discovery." She inherited "a considerable sum of money from him on his death."

His oldest son Roderic O'Connor emigrated to Australia with his two sons, where he became a significant landowner and public official in Tasmania. Two of Roger's sons were brought up by Burdett. One of these was Feargus O'Connor, one of the main leaders of the Chartists. The other was Francisco Burdett O'Connor, a commander in Simón Bolívar's army and, later, a Bolivian politician.

== Assessment ==
Prendergast concludes that O'Connor showed great courage in his patriotic statements during his arrest and imprisonment for alleged sedition, but that his eccentric personality and Irish nationalism "rendered him so odious [in the eyes of his enemies] that the grossest charges would be willingly believed". James Dunkerley says that several authors have described O'Connor as "a little mad", adding that the Chronicles of Eri is a "colourful concoction - a more 'imagined community' it would be hard to locate outside of Atlantis". Madden considered him to be possessed of considerable "cleverness, cunning, astuteness and plausibility", but argued that the personal charm and persuasiveness that made his conversation and speech-making so powerful, was never translated into print. His writings were bombastic: "he wrote in the genuine Boanerges Bombastes-Furioso style, wherein the swaggering Pistol talked in the true Ercles vein. His various political pamphlets are couched in terms of extravagant hyperbole".
