= Campaign of Sucre in Upper Peru =

- Part of Spanish American Wars of Independence
- Map of Bolivia and Peru early 19th century
- Commanded by: General Antonio José de Sucre
- Objective: Free Upper Peru
- Date: January to April 1825
- Outcome: Patriot victory

The Campaign of Sucre in Upper Peru was a set of military operations conducted by the Liberator United Army of Peru to dislodge the Spanish royalists in Upper Peru or Charcas. They were started after the Battle of Ayacucho (8 December 1824) and concluded with the surrender of the last Royalist groups after the Battle of Tumusla on 1 April 1825.

== The campaign ==
On 6 February, Marshal Sucre at the head of the Liberation Army crossed the Desaguadero River to occupy La Paz. General José María Córdova, with his Colombian division, stayed in La Paz for three months. Francisco Burdett O'Connor commanded the Division of Peru that invaded Upper Peru towards Potosí.

Royalist general Pedro Antonio Olañeta held out in Potosí. When he was informed of the defection of half of his forces under Col. Carlos Medinaceli Lizarazu, Olañeta attacked this force on 1 April 1825. Olañeta was wounded in the Combat of Tumusla and fell to the ground. As a consequence, his soldiers surrendered. Olaneta died the following day, 2 April.
That same day, Col. Medinaceli informed Marshal Sucre of the result of the battle, who declared the military campaign as ended.

== See also ==
- Antonio José de Sucre
