= Otto Philipp Braun =

German war volunteer in South America

Felipe Braun
- Otto Philipp Braun
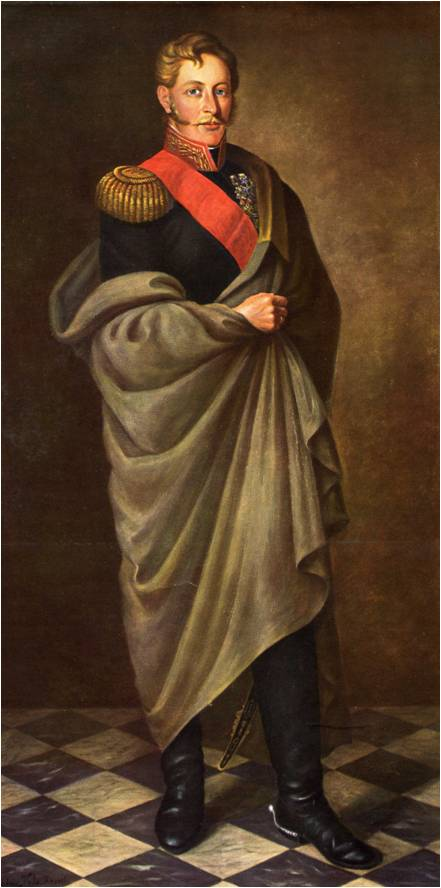

Minister of War and Navy of the Peru-Bolivian Confederation
- In office 9 July 1838 – 22 February 1839
- President: Andrés de Santa Cruz
- Preceded by: Anselmo Quiroz
- Succeeded by: José Ballivián (As Minister of War of Bolivia)

Minister of War and Navy of Bolivia
- In office 22 June 1835 – 25 July 1835
- President: Andrés de Santa Cruz
- Preceded by: José Miguel de Velasco
- Succeeded by: José Manuel del Castillo
- In office 11 May 1836 – 28 March 1838
- President: Andrés de Santa Cruz
- Preceded by: José Manuel del Castillo
- Succeeded by: Anselmo Quiroz (As Minister of War and Navy of the Peru-Bolivian Confederation)

Personal details
- Born: December 13, 1798 Kassel, Landgraviate of Hesse-Kassel (now Germany)
- Died: July 24, 1869 (aged 70) Bad Wildungen, Kassel

Military service
- Battles/wars: List: Venezuelan War of Independence; Ecuadorian War of Independence; Peruvian War of Independence; Bolivian War of Independence; Gran Colombia–Peru War; War of the Confederation; Argentine Peru-Bolivian War

Otto Philipp Braun (13 December 1798 – 24 July 1869), also known as Felipe Braun during his time in South America, was one of the most successful foreign volunteers participating in the independence war of South America. He was an important supporter of Simon Bolívar and Antonio José de Sucre and later of Andrés de Santa Cruz. In 1838 Braun was awarded the title “Great Marshal of Montenegro” being Bolivia's only Great Marshal and South America's only foreign Marshal to this day.

== Early life ==
Braun went to school in Kassel until he joined the volunteer brigade of the horseback rangers of the Electorate of Hesse in 1814 in order to fight against the troops of Napoleon. Afterwards Braun went to Hannover where he studied veterinary medicine. He continued his studies at the University of Göttingen.

In 1818 Braun left crisis-ridden Europe and emigrated to the United States. There he failed to establish himself as a veterinarian. His stay on Haiti as the official horse instructor of King Henri Christophe ended also without the desired long-term contract.

== Military life ==
=== Liberation of South America ===
Therefore, he joined the army of Simón Bolívar in the midyear of 1820 as a low ranking officer. Felipe Braun, as he was called from then on, participated in the campaigns of New Granada and the Battle of Carabobo in Venezuela. He joined the Guard of Simón Bolívar in 1821 and accompanied him on his Campaign of South to liberate today's Ecuador and Peru as one of his many officers.

On August 6, 1824, Braun was the first patriotic soldier to set foot on the plain of Junín, where a superior cavalry force of the royalistic-Spanish army of José de Canterac was waiting. Due to Braun's unusual conduct and over the years highly trained and well disciplined units, the patriotic cavalry not only resisted the superiority but was able to defeat their opponent. Braun was promoted and belonged from then on to the intimate circle around Simón Bolívar and Antonio José de Sucre.

With the latter Braun participated in the liberation of Upper Peru (later Republic of Bolivia). During his time in Bolivia (1825–1828) Braun served the Bolivian President Antonio José de Sucre loyally. After uprisings in Cochabamba and La Paz, in which parts of the unit Braun commanded participated, he fell into disgrace. This changed fundamentally when Braun withstood other attempts and bravely attacked the Peruvian invasion of Bolivia of 1828 under general Agustín Gamarra.

=== Revolutionary aftermath ===
In the Peruvian-Colombian war of 1828/29 Braun fought on the side of Simón Bolívar, Antonio José de Sucre and Juan José Flores. After a failed diplomatic mission as official representative of the victors, Braun had to flee, ending up in Valparaíso, Chile (1829). A few months later Braun was able to travel to Arequipa, Peru, where finally met his wife Justa Germana de Rivero y Abrill, who he had married through written authority in 1828.

In Arequipa Braun spend almost a year until the Bolivian president Andrés de Santa Cruz asked Braun to join his new administration. Braun accepted and moved to Bolivia. From 1830 until 1839 Braun became one of the most successful generals in Bolivian history. Furthermore, Braun became a very valuable adviser of President Santa Cruz. Santa Cruz made him Prefect, entrusted whole armies, and let him command battles and gave him the responsibility of the ministry of defense. During the Peru-Bolivian Confederation (1836–1839) Braun served Santa Cruz loyally. After Braun triumphed in the Battle of Montenegro against an Argentine invasion in June 1838, Santa Cruz awarded Braun with the Title Great Marshal of Montenegro. Until today Braun is the only foreigner ever to have gained this title in South America and the only marshal of Bolivia at all.

After Santa Cruz lost the Battle of Yungay in January 1839 against a Peruvian-Chilean invasion, his confederation collapsed due to a revolution led by José Ballivián and José Miguel de Velasco, and Braun's career was over. He had to leave Bolivia and headed back to Europe when the new president of Bolivia, General José Miguel de Velasco, dismissed Braun and removed all of his titles. Years later in 1850 he was rehabilitated by President Manuel Isidoro Belzu, after which he returned several times to Bolivia and Peru where he had commercial ventures in copper mines and coffee plantations.

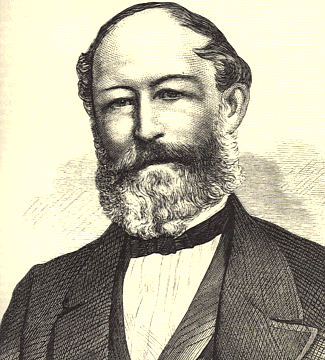
Braun in old age

== Later years ==
In 1861 after numerous transatlantic travels between Europe and South America, Braun left the continent forever. Eight years later Braun died in Bad Wildungen. He was put to rest in his near hometown Kassel. Dozens of newspapers in Europe and South America remembered the contribution Otto Philipp Braun made to the independence of South America as well as to the construction of the Republic of Bolivia. His remains are in the Basilica of San Francisco, La Paz, Bolivia.
