= Cangrejillos =

Coordinates: 22°25′08″S 65°34′48″W

- Rural municipality and village
- Interactive map of Cangrejillos
- Country: Argentina
- Province: Jujuy Province
- Time zone: UTC−3 (ART)

Cangrejillos is a rural municipality and village in Jujuy Province in Argentina.
