= Santa Catalina, Jujuy =

Coordinates: 21°57′S 66°04′W

Santa Catalina (Jujuy)
- Municipality and town
- Interactive map of Santa Catalina (Jujuy)
- Country: Argentina
- Province: Jujuy Province
- Time zone: UTC−3 (ART)

Santa Catalina (Jujuy) is a town and municipality in Jujuy Province in Argentina. It is the northernmost permanently inhabited town in Argentina, and is a high altitude mining town (3770 m) where inhabitants also raise llamas and other animals, and cultivate fruit.
