= Tumusla =

- Location in Bolivia
- Coordinates: 20°29′26″S 65°37′13″W
- Country: Bolivia
- Department: Potosí Department
- Province: Nor Chichas Province
- Municipality: Cotagaita Municipality
- Canton: Tumusla Canton

Population (2012)
  - Total: 279
- Time zone: GMT-4

Tumusla is a village in the Nor Chichas Province, in the Potosí Department of Bolivia.

It was the site of the Battle of Tumusla on 1 April 1825.
