= Battle of Tumusla =

Bolivian War of Independence battle

Coordinates: 20°29′26″S 65°37′13″W

- Part of the Bolivian War of Independence
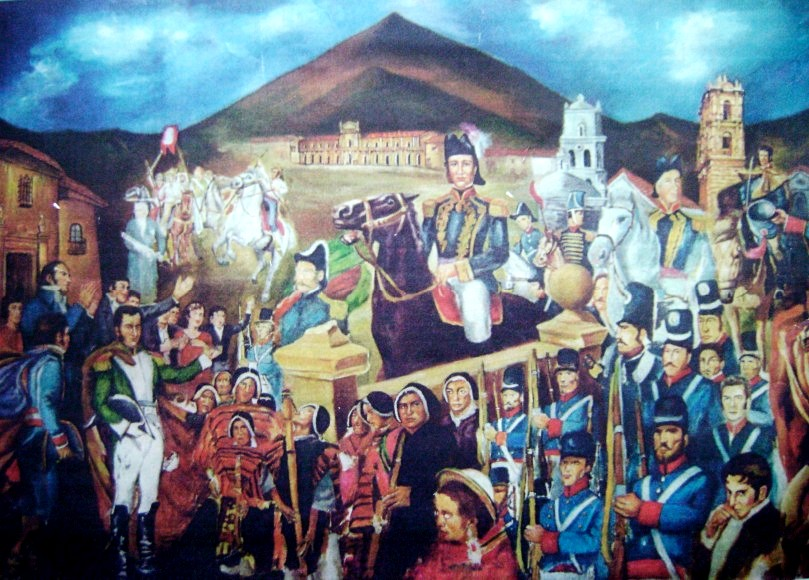
- Battle of Tumusla
Date	01 April 1825
Location	Tumusla (Bolivia)
Result	Patriot victory

Belligerents
Peru; Gran Colombia	Kingdom of Spain and the Indies (since 1700)

Commanders and leaders
Carlos Medinaceli Lizarazu	Pedro Antonio de Olañeta (WIA)

Units involved
Liberating Army	Royal Army

The Battle of Tumusla was the last battle between regular forces during the Bolivian War of Independence and one of the last encounters of the Spanish American wars of independence. This battle was fought on 1 April 1825, near the village of Tumusla (Potosí), in the current territory of Bolivia. It was a defeat for the Royalist forces under command of Pedro Antonio Olañeta, who was killed.

== The Battle ==
After the decisive defeat of the main royalist armies in the Battle of Ayacucho in Peru, on 9 December 1824, and the capture of Spanish Viceroy José de la Serna e Hinojosa, the only remain royalist army on the continent was that of Pedro Antonio Olañeta in Upper Peru (today's Bolivia).

Hopelessly outnumbered and low on moral, this army was unable to oppose the 1825 advance of the patriot army under command of Antonio José de Sucre. When his second in command, Carlos Medinaceli Lizarazu, defected with half the troops to the patriots, the furious Pedro Antonio Olañeta ordered an attack on his own ex-troops led by Colonel Medinaceli Lizarazu.

On 2 April 1825, the two forces met at the village of Tumusla, south of Potosi. Olañeta was mortally wounded and died the following day. All remaining royalist soldiers surrendered or defected.

Controversies remain today over the development of this battle. In some versions, there was no real battle and Olañeta was killed by his own men or committed suicide. Other versions claim that the importance of the battle was later diminished by Sucre, because he actually failed to defeat and capture Olañeta.

== Consequences ==
This battle of the Bolivian war of independence was the last engagement in an open field by regular armies in South America. After the battle Antonio José de Sucre, who had reached Potosí, called a congress of Upper Peru and saw the creation of Bolivia as a new independent nation on 6 August 1825.
