= Roger Connor (judge) =

British judge

Roger David Connor DL (born 8 June 1939) is a British judge.

== Early life ==
Connor was born in 1939, the son of Susie Violet (née Spittlehouse) and Thomas Bernard Connor. He attended Merchant Taylors' School in London, before studying at Brunel College of Advanced Science and Technology. He then studied law at The College of Law.

== Legal career ==
Connor's professional career began as a solicitor. He did an apprenticeship with J. R. Hodder between 1963 and 1968, before working as an assistant solicitor. In 1970, he became a partner in Hodders Solicitors, a position he held until 1983. He served as a Metropolitan Stipendiary Magistrate between 1983 and 1991, acting as a recorder for the last four of these years. In 1991, he became a circuit judge. He retired in 2005, and was appointed a Deputy Lieutenant of Buckinghamshire.

During his time as a judge, he was once suspended from a case for laughing during the speech of a defence counsel.

=== Views ===
When interviewed in 2005, Connor expressed his support of Drug Testing and Treatment Orders, which enable drug-related offenders to receive treatment in place of custodial sentences. Connor described these orders as "wonderful when they work", although they could only really be used "when the defendant is sufficiently motivated". Connor also expressed disagreement with judges who sentence mental health sufferers to prison terms, which he called a "disgrace".

== Personal life ==
Connor married Sandra Home Holmes in 1967. They have two sons. They live in Little Missenden in Buckinghamshire.

Connor's interests include playing golf and gardening. He is a member of Beaconsfield Golf Club and East Devon Golf Club. and a Deputy Lieutenant of Buckinghamshire.
