= James Dunkerley =

British professor of politics (born 1953)

Sir James Dunkerley OBE
- Born: James Chadwick Dunkerley; 15 August 1953 (age 73); Wokingham

Sir James Chadwick Dunkerley (born 15 August 1953) OBE is Professor of Politics at Queen Mary, University of London, and the former Director of the Institute for the Study of the Americas and the Institute of Latin American Studies of the University of London. He has written extensively on Bolivia, Central America, and elsewhere in Latin America and was the editor of the Journal of Latin American Studies. Further, he has been on the editorial boards of Government and Opposition and Norteamérica. He has served as Andrés Bello Professor of Latin American Culture and Civilization at New York University and is a Fellow of the Academy Social Sciences and the Royal Historical Society.

Dunkerley was appointed Officer of the Order of the British Empire (OBE) in the 2010 Birthday Honours.

== Early life and education ==
James Dunkerley was born in Wokingham and spent his early education at Abingdon School, a boarding school outside of Oxford. He then went on to study Modern History at the University of York between 1971 and 1974. Upon counseling by his professor and mentor Gwyn Alf Williams, Dunkerley pursued an MPhil in Latin American Studies and a DPhil at the University of Oxford's Hertford and Nuffield colleges, citing then-professors Isaiah Berlin, Leszek Kolakowski, and Charles Taylor as pivotal influences.

== Publications ==
- The Long War. Dictatorship and Revolution in El Salvador. London: Junction Books, 1982.
- Rebellion in the Veins. Political Struggle in Bolivia, 1952-1982. London: Verso, 1984.
- Orígenes del Poder Militar en Bolivia. Historia del Ejército, 1879-1935. La Paz: Quipus Editores/Plural, 1987/2003.
- Power in the Isthmus. A Political History of Modern Central America. London: Verso, 1988.
- Political Suicide in Latin America and Other Essays. London: Verso, 1992.
- The Pacification of Central America. Political Change in the Isthmus, 1987-93. London: Verso, 1994.
- British documents on foreign affairs: reports and papers from the Foreign Office confidential print. University Publications of America. 1998. ISBN 978-1-55655-673-9.
- (co-edited with Victor Bulmer-Thomas) The United States and Latin America. The New Agenda. ILAS, The David Rockefeller Center for Latin American Studies, and Harvard UP, 1999.
- Americana: The Americas in the World, around 1850. London: Verso, 2000.
- Warriors and Scribes: Essays on the History and Politics of Latin America. London: Verso, 2000.
- Studies in the Formation of the Nation-State in Latin America. London: ILAS, 2002.
- (co-edited with Maria D'Alva Kinzo) Brazil since 1985: Economics, Politics and Society. London: ILAS, 2003.
- Bolivia: Revolution and the Power of History in the Present. London: ISA, 2007.
- Crusoe and his Consequences. New York: OR Books, 2019.
