= Roger Connors =

- Education: Brigham Young University
- Occupations: Executive, author

Roger Connors is an American business author, leadership consultant, co-founder, and former chief executive officer of Partners In Leadership (now rebranded as Culture Partners). He is best known as the co-author of The Oz Principle: Getting Results Through Individual and Organizational Accountability, first published in 1994.

== Career ==
Connors co-founded Partners In Leadership and later served as its chief executive officer. He currently serves as the chief executive officer of Human Performance Technologies, LLC.

He is ranked by the Top 30 Global Gurus as one of the world's Top 10 Organizational Culture Professionals. In addition to his publishing accomplishments, he established a career as a keynote speaker and educator, presenting at leadership conferences, corporate events, and professional gatherings.

== Publications ==
Connors is the author or co-author of numerous books on leadership, accountability, and organizational culture, including The Oz Principle, Journey to the Emerald City, How Did That Happen?, Change the Culture, Change the Game, The Wisdom of Oz, Fix It, Get A Coach, Be A Coach, Divine Patterns, and Healing the Wounded Heart.

How Did That Happen? appeared on The New York Times Best Seller list on August 30, 2009, and December 6, 2009. Change the Culture, Change the Game appeared on The New York Times Best Seller list on January 23, 2011.

== Education and Academic Roles ==
Connors earned a Master of Business Administration from Brigham Young University, graduating with distinction.

He has served as a graduate faculty professional member in the MBA program at Utah Valley University's Woodbury School of Business, where he also received an honorary Doctor of Humane Letters. He currently serves on the Foundation Board as First Vice-chair for Utah Valley University. Additionally, Connors served on UVU's Evergreen Campaign Committee, participating in the university's first-ever multi-year comprehensive fundraising campaign that raised over 250 million dollars.

== Personal life ==
A member of The Church of Jesus Christ of Latter-day Saints, Connors and his wife, Gwen, served as mission leaders of the Washington Kennewick Mission. He has also served as a stake president and as a branch president at the Provo Missionary Training Center. Most recently, he and his wife served a mission in Africa as the Infield Representative for the Missionary Department.
