= Irish Legion =

Irish Legion 3rd Foreign Regiment (Irish)
- Obverse and reverse of the Legion's standard
- Active: August 1803 – September 1815
- Country: French First Republic; First French Empire
- Branch: French Imperial Army
- Type: Light Infantry
- Size: Regiment of four battalions (Note: The regimental depot and depot battalion are not included in this figure, as they are not combat units.)
- Part of: Imperial Foreign Troops
- Dépôt: Bois-le-Duc, Bouches-du-Rhin
- Engagements: Napoleonic Wars; Peninsular War; Dos de Mayo Uprising; French Invasion of Portugal; Siege of Ciudad Rodrigo; Battle of Fuentes de Oñoro; War of the Fifth Coalition; Walcheren Campaign; War of the Sixth Coalition; Battle of the Katzbach; Battle of Bautzen; Battle of Hanau

The Irish Legion (French: Légion irlandaise) was a light infantry regiment in service of the French Imperial Army established in 1803 for an anticipated invasion of Ireland. It was later expanded to a four battalions and a depot, the legion won distinction in the Walcheren Expedition, the Peninsular War, and the German campaign of 1813. Following the disbandment of the foreign regiments in 1815, the regiment's personnel were distributed.

== Establishment ==
The first officers included members of the Society of United Irishmen who had fled to France in 1797. It also included Irishmen who had been taken during the 1798 rebellion who were freed during the short peace effected by the Treaty of Amiens on condition of exile, and who had sailed for France in June 1802. The treaty broke down in May 1803 with the start of the War of the Third Coalition. As a part of Napoleon's planned invasion of the United Kingdom in 1803–05, the Irish Legion was to provide the indigenous core for a much larger invasion force of 20,000 earmarked to take Ireland, known as the Corps d'Irlande.

The Legion was established on 31 August 1803 in Morlaix, France. Bernard MacSheehy was assigned to form the regiment. He was an Adjutant-General in Napoleon's army.

The purpose of the Legion was to align the Irish hearts to the French cause in the imminent invasion of Ireland. General Pierre Augereau had been ordained to lead the invasion, and wanted Irishmen to serve in his army. However, the Battle of Cape Finisterre and the Battle of Trafalgar in 1805 made a safe sea crossing uncertain at best, and Napoleon was forced to abandon his plans for Ireland. He shifted his focus towards Austria and Eastern Europe and launched the Austerlitz campaign in late 1805. The legion remained on the French coast on garrison duty and coastal defence.

== Formation and colours ==
The Legion was eventually expanded from a battalion to a regiment and there was greater demand for more soldiers. These made a varied group; some were former United Irishmen who were taken prisoner in 1798-99 and then freed during the peace that followed the Treaty of Amiens (1802–03), some had been impressed into the Royal Navy and deserted, and some were German or Polish. While the Legion was stationed at the Fortress of Mainz in 1806, they were joined by 1,500 Poles and many Irishmen who were sent in 1799 to serve the King of Prussia, Its headquarters was at 's-Hertogenbosch, known to the French as Bois-le-Duc, in what was then the Kingdom of Holland.

The Irish Legion had its own flag, and in December 1805 received an eagle. The Legion was the only group of foreign soldiers in the French military to whom Napoleon ever gave an eagle. Wearing a green uniform, its maximum size was about 2,000 men.

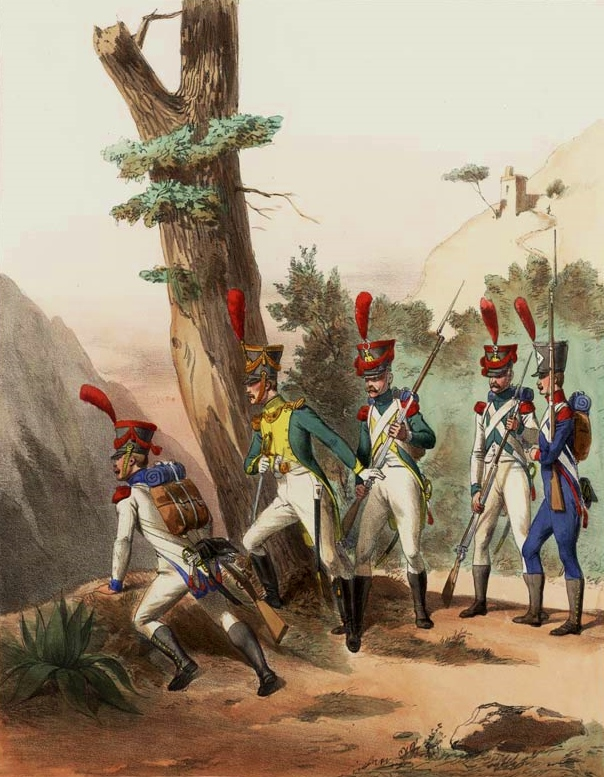
Foreign regiments in the French Army 1810. Painting of 1830 by Alfred de Marbot (1812-1865). In the center, wearing green uniforms, officer and carabinier of the Irish Legion.

The regiment was greatly assisted from 1807 by Napoleon's war minister Marshal of France Henri Clarke, who was born in France to Irish parents and whose family had close links to the ancien regime Irish brigade that had served the kings of France. He and his father had served in Dillon's Regiment, and his mother's father and several uncles served in Clare's Regiment. In August 1811 the Legion was renamed the 3e Regiment Etranger (Irlandais) (3rd Foreign Regiment (Irish)), but throughout the unit's history it was always referred to as the Irish Regiment.

== Actions ==
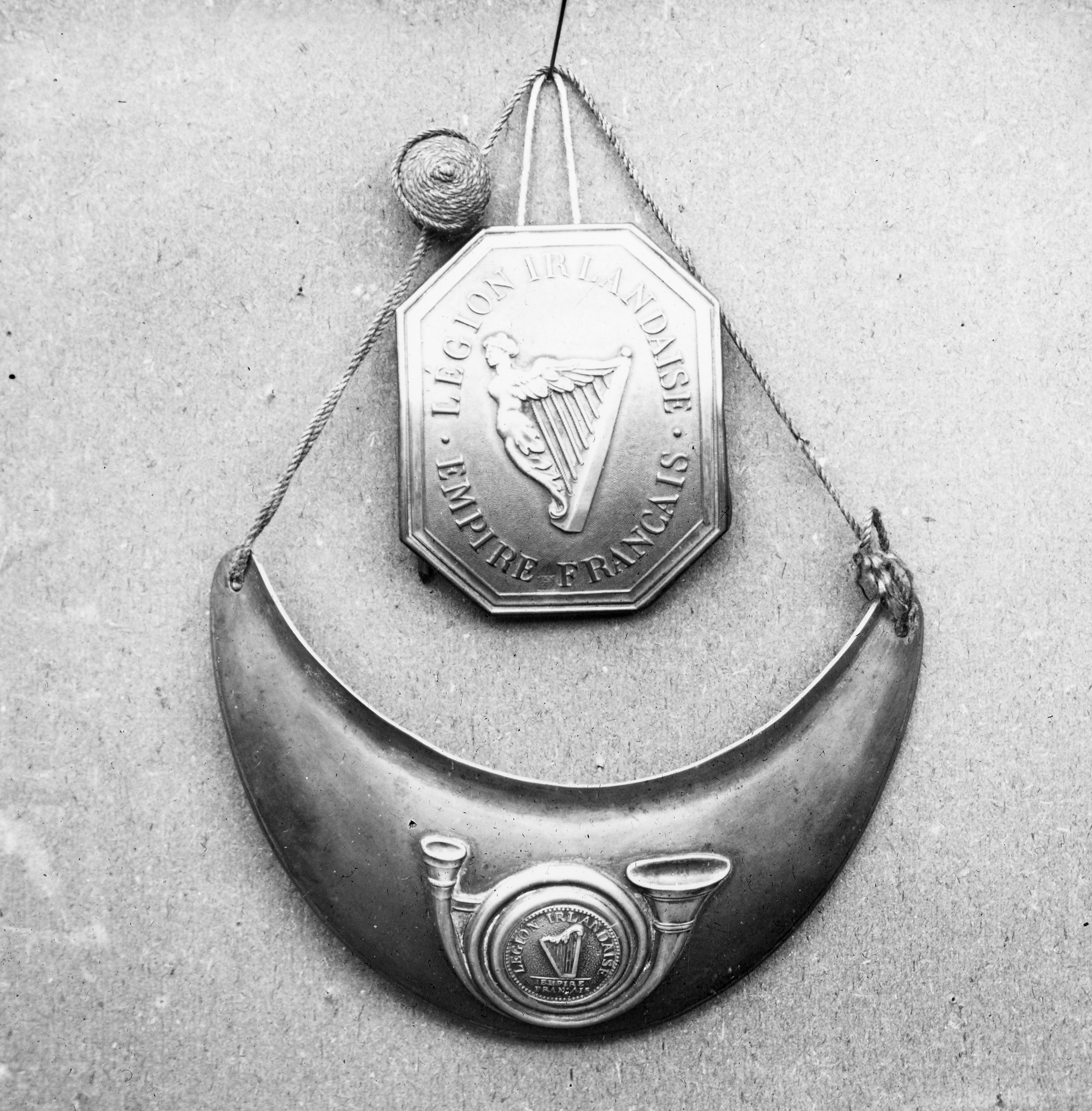
Soldier's regalia seen in an Irish museum, circa 1910.

In 1808 the Second Battalion fought in the Peninsular War, helping to subdue Madrid during the Dos de Mayo Uprising.

The First Battalion saw its first action at the Battle of Flushing in the Walcheren Campaign of 1809, suffering many casualties from malaria.[1]

In the middle of January 1810 the 3rd Battalion was posted to Spain. In June 1810 an Army of Portugal was formed under Masséna which was composed of three Army Corps. The two battalions of the Irish Legion became part of General Junot’s 8th Corps. Before joining with the Massena's main army, Junot was detailed to secure the flank of the Army of Portugal's intended advance by capturing the city of Astorga in the Province of León. They led the assault that took the city. During the battle, Captain John Allen's company's drummer boy continued to beat the charge after having lost both legs, for which he was given the French Legion of Honor. The Irish Battalions remained on active service with the Army of Portugal through the sieges of Ciudad Rodrigo and Almeida, the Battle of Bussaco and the full course of the advance to the Lines of Torres Vedras.

In September 1810, at the Battle of Bussaco, elite companies of the Irish Legion engaged an Irish regiment in the British army, the 88th Foot (Connaught Rangers). William Grattan's Adventure of the Connaught Rangers details an engagement between the two units among the rocks above Bussaco. The Connaughts led an epic bayonet charge against the French troops there and after the action, Grattan explains, he came across the French 4th regiment and the Irish Brigade (meaning, of course, the Irish Regiment) on the rocks there, mentioning that several of the latter were wounded but there were no Irishmen among them (denoting that the wounded men from the Irish Regiment were all foreigners).

Napoleon had decreed on 28 October 1810 that the Irish Regiment should be reduced to two battalions, whereby the 2nd and 3rd Battalions would become the 2nd Battalion. The reformed 2nd Battalion saw hard service as part of the rearguard on the retreat from Lisbon. By the time it arrived back in Spain, the unit had nineteen officers and 254 men present with the colours, and another 128 men absent from sickness or other reasons.

Solignac's Division took the field once more in the spring of 1811 for the relief of Almeida; at this time the battalion strength was 390 officers and men. Between 3 and 5 May, heavy fighting took place at Fuentes de Oñoro and on the slopes in the vicinity. On the first day, Solignac's Division was held in reserve behind the centre-right of Massena's line and the Irish remained idle all day. On the 5th they were the general reserve to the flanking attack made on the British right wing and again were not engaged.

In early December 1811, the orders arrived in Spain for the return to France of the officers and non-commissioned officers of the Irish Battalion. The non-Irish privates were to be incorporated into the Prussian Regiment serving with the Army of Portugal. It was not until 11 April 1812 that they arrived at the regimental depot at Bois-le-Duc (s’Hertogenbosch) in The Netherlands.

Early in 1813 the Irish Regiment was ordered to merge the three existing battalions into two full-strength war battalions. Command of the 1st Battalion went to Chef de Bataillon John Tennent (Note: On his commission papers his name was spelt as ‘Tenant’. In France, unaccustomed with the name, they used about all the different possibilities of the spelling: Tennant, Tennent, Tenent, Tenant) and that of the 2nd Battalion to Chef de Bataillon Hugh Ware. On 1 February they broke camp and made a long winter march to Magdeburg. The Irish Regiment made forced marches to arrive on the battlefield of Bautzen during the morning of 21 May, the second day of the battle. At the head of Puthod’s Division they attacked Barclay’s Corps on the extreme allied right.

On 26 May they fought with distinction at the Battle of Hanau under the direct command of the emperor. The Irish were rewarded by being given the honour of posting guard at the town of Lignitz (Legnica) for Napoleon until the Imperial Guard arrived and relieved them.

On 16 August, at the end of the brief armistice, Puthod's Division, including Vacherau's Brigade (The Irish Regiment, 134th & 143rd Regiments), were assembled at Goldberg in Silesia. On the eighteenth Blucher’s cavalry made contact with Puthod. The regiment formed squares to repel a cavalry attack: the squares held fast, and after a number of attempts to break them, the enemy backed off and brought forward artillery. They were then easy targets for cannon fire, losing 400 men before retiring in good order. (Note: The Irish Regiment lost three hundred men killed or wounded. Two officers were killed and ten wounded.)

Following Macdonald’s retreat after the Battle of the Katzbach with Blucher, General Pothod's Division became isolated from the rest of the army. The River Bober (Bóbr) had risen out of its banks from the heavy rains and the bridges were under water. The division had been reduced to six thousand men and twelve pieces of artillery. On the morning of 29 August they reached the town of Lowenberg/Lwówek Śląski. It took up the best position it could find, on the narrow ridge above Plakowice, with its back to the river. All the bridges had been washed away and there was no possibility of constructing a bridge with the river flooding its banks on both sides. A combined Russian and Prussian Army of overwhelming superiority faced the Division but could only attack at the one narrow south-eastern end of the ridge. The battle began at 8:00 am and lasted until after 4:00pm. When the Division had expended the last of its ammunition, the enemy attacked and overran its position. Most of the officers waded into the river and swam to the opposite shore. The riverbed itself was not terribly wide although the current was strong. They were able to wade about half the distance, swim a short way, and walk through the water to dry land. James Perry swam over and back again to come to the aid of General Puthod, whose ADC he was, and both were taken prisoner. (Note: Lieutenant James Perry had been adjutant major to the 2nd Battalion at the siege of Astorga in 1810.The Irish were given the honour of leading the assault and he was wounded carrying a ladder to the breach; he was awarded the Legion of Honour.) The total French casualties of killed, wounded, drowned and captured was more the 3,000.

The Irish Regiment no longer existed as a fighting unit. Twenty-three officers out of 47 and 94 non-commissioned officers and soldiers returned from the campaign of 1813. Out of approximately 2,000 men who had marched to join the Grand Army eight months earlier, only 117 were left. The survivors managed to save their eagle and retired to Bois-le-Duc.

In the ensuing Napoleonic retreat the regiment took part in the Siege of Antwerp 1814 and retired to Lille, where it remained until Napoleon's abdication in April 1814.

In 1805-15 eleven of the regiment's officers were awarded the Legion d'honneur, including Chef de Bataillon Myles Byrne, the colonel, William Lawless, Chef de Bataillon John Tennent, and James Bartholomew Blackwell.

== Disbandment ==
The regiment divided in loyalty during the "Hundred Days", and was officially disbanded by King Louis XVIII on 28 September 1815. Its flags were burned and its eagle, like many, disappeared.
