= William Lawless =

- Miniature portrait of Lawless.
- Born: 20 April 1772; Dublin, Ireland
- Died: 25 December 1824 (aged 52); Paris, France
- Burial place: Pere Lachaise Cemetery
- Military career
- Allegiance: United Irishmen; French First Republic; First French Empire
- Service years: 1800–1814
- Rank: Général de brigade
- Unit: Irish Legion
- Conflicts: Irish Rebellion of 1798; Anglo-Russian invasion of Holland; Napoleonic Wars; German Campaign of 1813; Battle of Dresden (WIA)

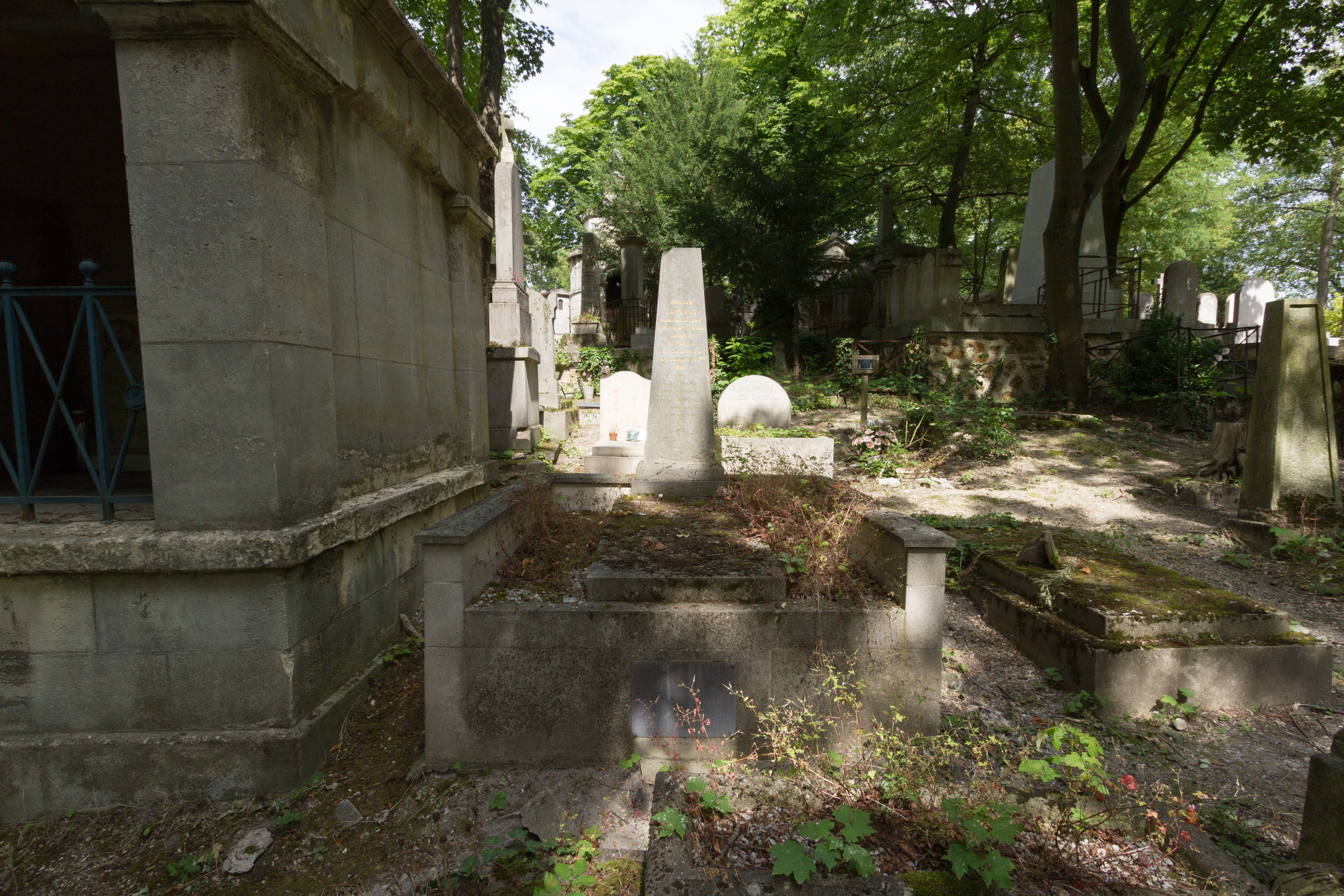
Pere Lachaise Cemetery.

General William Lawless (20 April 1772 – 25 December 1824) was a Dublin-born surgeon and important member of the Society of the United Irishmen, a revolutionary republican organisation in late 18th century Ireland.

Lawless, a Catholic, was the confidant of Lord Edward FitzGerald, and Professor of Anatomy and Physiology in the Royal College of Surgeons, Dublin. Closely connected with John Sheares in the direction of affairs in the spring of 1798, a warrant for his arrest was issued on 20 May with a reward of £300. Timely notice was, however, given him of the fact by Mr. Stewart, the Surgeon-General, and he escaped to France, where his abilities and spirit recommended him to the special favour of Napoleon. While in Paris, he spent time with other United Irishmen in exile, including Myles Byrne and William James MacNeven.

He was placed on half-pay in 1800, but in 1803 was appointed captain of the Irish Legion, and in July 1806 was ordered to Vlissingen, then besieged by the British, to command the Irish battalion. To reach his post he had to pass in a small open boat through the British fleet. He was dangerously wounded in a sortie, and when General Monet capitulated without stipulating for the treatment of the Irish as prisoners of war, Lawless escaped from the town with the eagle of his regiment, concealed himself for two months in a doctor's house, and at length found an opportunity of getting by night in a fishing boat to Antwerp. Marshall Jean Baptiste Jules Bernadotte welcomed him, extolled him in general orders, and reported his exploits to Napoleon, who summoned him to Paris, decorated him with the Legion of Honour, and promoted him to be lieutenant-colonel. In 1812 he gained a colonelcy, and on 21 August 1813 he lost a leg at the battle of Dresden.

After the restoration of the Bourbons, Lawless was returned, in October 1814, to half-pay with the rank of brigadier-general. General Lawless died in Paris, on 25 December 1824, aged 52. His remains were buried at Père Lachaise Cemetery in Paris. Thomas Moore described him as "a person of that mild and quiet exterior which is usually found to accompany the most determined spirit."
