= Subdivisions of the Peru–Bolivian Confederation =

Territorial organisation of the Peru–Bolivian Confederation

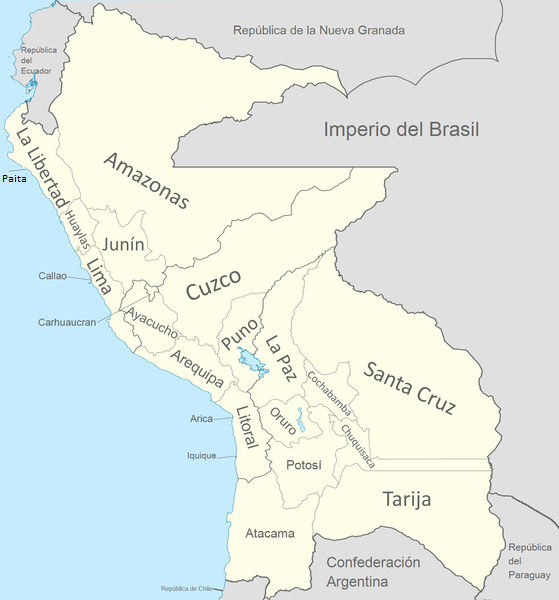
De jure map of the Confederation.

The Peru-Bolivian Confederation was divided into 3 states; North Peru, South Peru and the Bolivian Republic. These states were subdivided into departments; 17 total, 5 for North Peru, 5 for South Peru and 7 for Bolivia. Each department was then further subdivided into provinces.

== Subdivisions ==
States	Types of division		
States	Capital	Departments	Map
Republic of North Peru	Lima	1. Amazonas Department; 2. Huaylas Department; 3. Junín Department; 4. La Libertad Department; 5. Lima Department	
Republic of South Peru	Tacna	1. Arequipa Department; 2. Ayacucho Department; 3. Cuzco Department; 4. Littoral Department; 5. Puno Department	
Bolivian Republic	La Paz	1. Cochabamba Department; 2. Chuquisaca Department; 3. La Paz Department; 4. Oruro Department; 5. Potosí Department; 6. Santa Cruz Department; 7. Tarija Department	

== See also ==
- Port of Arica (Peru–Bolivian Confederation), a special administrative division of the confederation
- Atacama Province (1829–1839), a province with special status in Bolivia
- Iquicha, a de facto autonomous region of the confederation
