= Potosí Department (Peru–Bolivian Confederation) =

Department of the Peru–Bolivian Confederation

Potosí Department Departamento de Potosí
- Department of Bolivia
- 1836–1839
- Coat of arms

- Potosí within Bolivia
- Capital: Potosí
- Historical era: Confederation
  - Established: 1836
  - Disestablished: 1839
- Contained within
  - Constituent country: Bolivia
Preceded by	Succeeded by
Potosí Department	Potosí Department

Potosí Department (Spanish: Departamento de Potosí) was a department of Bolivia, a constituent country of the Peru–Bolivian Confederation, which existed from 1836 to 1839. Created alongside the confederate state, its capital was Potosí.

== History ==
Potosí sent deputies to the Congress of Tapacarí in June 1836, where the Bolivian government, under the command of General Andrés de Santa Cruz agreed that after the military intervention in Peru, give recognition to the creation of the Peruvian-Bolivian Confederation.

The Fundamental Law of 1837, signed in the city of Tacna, with the approval of the self-proclaimed supreme protector Andrés de Santa Cruz, recognized Potosí as a founding department of the Confederation.

Potosí was subject to the General Government, its governor was appointed by the president of the State, and this in turn was appointed by the supreme protector on duty. The governor was obliged to elect representatives of his department to participate in congressional meetings, which were ordered by the president of the Bolivian State.

== See also ==
- Subdivisions of the Peru–Bolivian Confederation
- Bolivian Republic (Peru-Bolivian Confederation)
