= Santa Cruz Department (Peru–Bolivian Confederation) =

Department of the Peru–Bolivian Confederation

Santa Cruz Department Departamento de Santa Cruz
- Department of Bolivia
- 1836–1839
- Coat of arms

- Santa Cruz within Bolivia
- Capital: Santa Cruz de la Sierra
- Historical era: Confederation
  - Established: 1836
  - Disestablished: 1839
- Contained within
  - Constituent country: Bolivia
Preceded by	Succeeded by
Santa Cruz Department	Santa Cruz Department

Santa Cruz Department (Spanish: Departamento de Santa Cruz) was a department of Bolivia, a constituent country of the Peru–Bolivian Confederation, which existed from 1836 to 1839. Created alongside the confederate state, its capital was Santa Cruz de la Sierra.

== History ==
Santa Cruz sent deputies to the Congress of Tapacarí in June 1836, where the Bolivian government, under the command of General Andrés de Santa Cruz agreed that after the military intervention in Peru, give recognition to the creation of the Peruvian-Bolivian Confederation.

The Fundamental Law of 1837, signed in the city of Tacna, with the approval of the self-proclaimed supreme protector Andrés de Santa Cruz, recognized Santa Cruz as a founding department of the Confederation.

Santa Cruz was subject to the General Government, its governor was appointed by the president of the State, and this in turn was appointed by the supreme protector on duty. The governor was obliged to elect representatives of his department to participate in congressional meetings, which were ordered by the president of the Bolivian State.

== See also ==
- Subdivisions of the Peru–Bolivian Confederation
- Bolivian Republic (Peru-Bolivian Confederation)
