= Department of the Littoral (Peru) =

Department of the Peru–Bolivian Confederation

Littoral
- Department of South Peru and Peru
- 1837–1857
- Flag Coat of arms

- Littoral within South Peru (1837–1839)
- Capital: Tacna
- Government
- Prefect
  - 1837–?: Manuel Mendiburu
- Historical era: Confederation
  - Established: 25 April 1837
  - Confederation ended: 25 August 1839
  - Disestablished: 2 January 1857
- Contained within
  - Constituent country: South Peru
- Subdivisions
  - Type: Provinces
  - Units: Tacna & Tarapacá
Preceded by	Succeeded by
Arequipa Department	Moquegua Department

Littoral, also known as Tacna, (Note: Not to be confused with the department of the same name (Spanish: Departamento del Litoral; Spanish: Departamento de Tacna).) was a department originally part of South Peru, a constituent country of the Peru–Bolivian Confederation, which existed from 1836 to 1839. Created alongside the confederate state, its capital was Tacna, the capital city of the confederation. After the state's dissolution, it continued to exist as part of Peru until the creation of the Department of Moquegua in 1857.

== History ==
The department was established when it was part of South Peru, a constituent country of the Peru–Bolivian Confederation, through a law issued on April 25, 1837 by Supreme Protector Andrés de Santa Cruz that separated it from the Department of the Law (i.e. Arequipa) while remaining under the jurisdiction of the Roman Catholic Archdiocese of Arequipa. It was formed by the provinces of Tacna and Tarapacá.

In 1839, the Confederate Army was defeated at the Battle of Yungay, and the new Peruvian provisional government of Agustín Gamarra, with the protection of the Chilean Army, declared the dissolution of the Confederation on August 25, 1839, initiating the national restoration period of Peru and creating the New Constituent General Congress of Peru. He substituted the confederate organization with a unitary organization, withdrew Bolivian public workers, and rebuilt Peru's international relations.

In 1857, the law of January 2 created the Department of Moquegua as a separate entity from Arequipa. The new department included the provinces of Moquegua, Tacna, Arica and Tarapacá.

== See also ==
- Subdivisions of the Peru–Bolivian Confederation
- Republic of South Peru
- Restoration (Peru)
