= Cathedral Basilica of Our Lady of Peace, La Paz =

Coordinates: 16.4965°S 68.1342°W

Cathedral Basilica of Our Lady of Peace
- Catedral Basílica de Nuestra Señora de La Paz
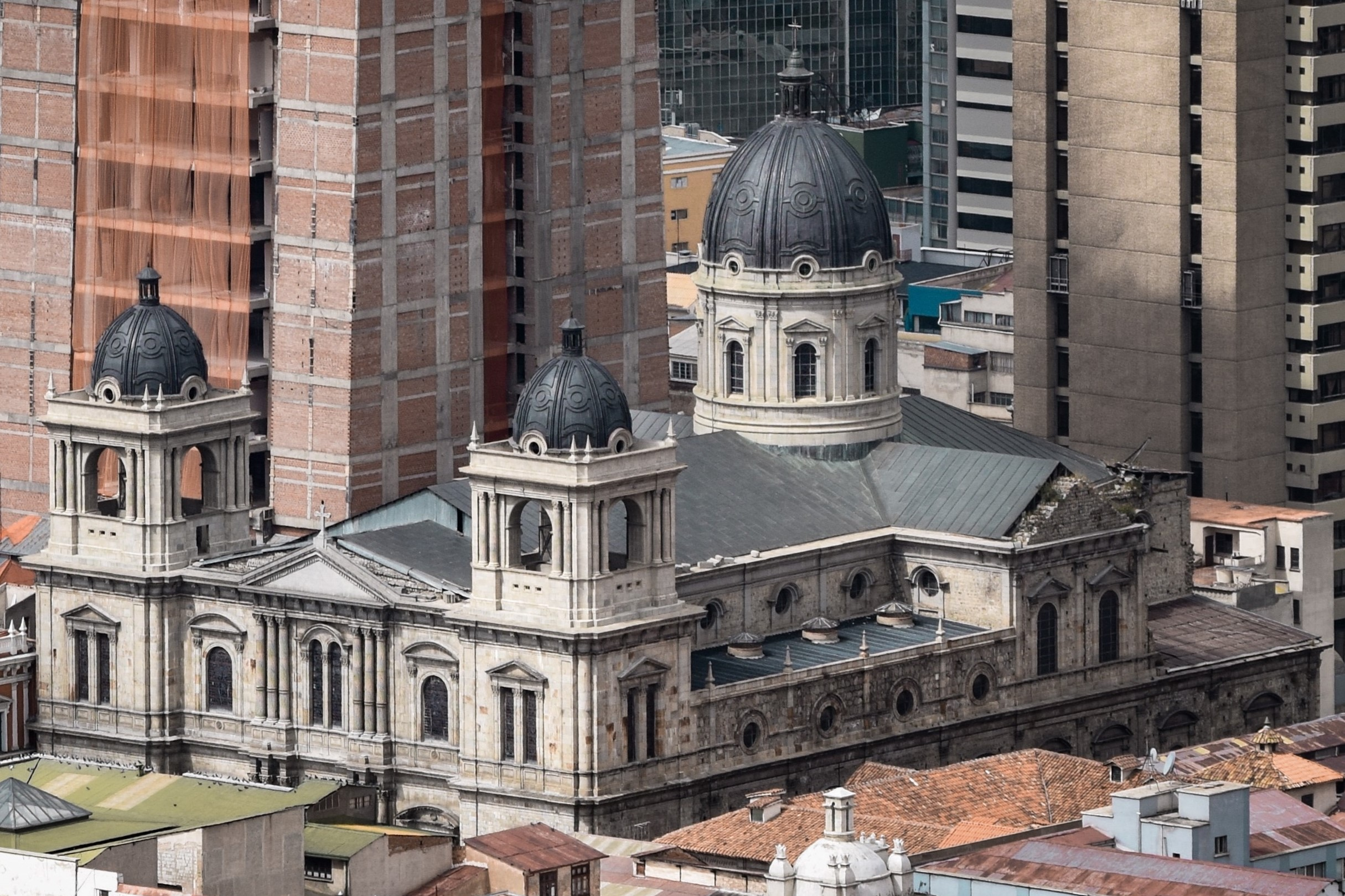
- Cathedral Basilica of Our Lady of Peace
- Location: La Paz
- Country: Bolivia
- Denomination: Roman Catholic Church

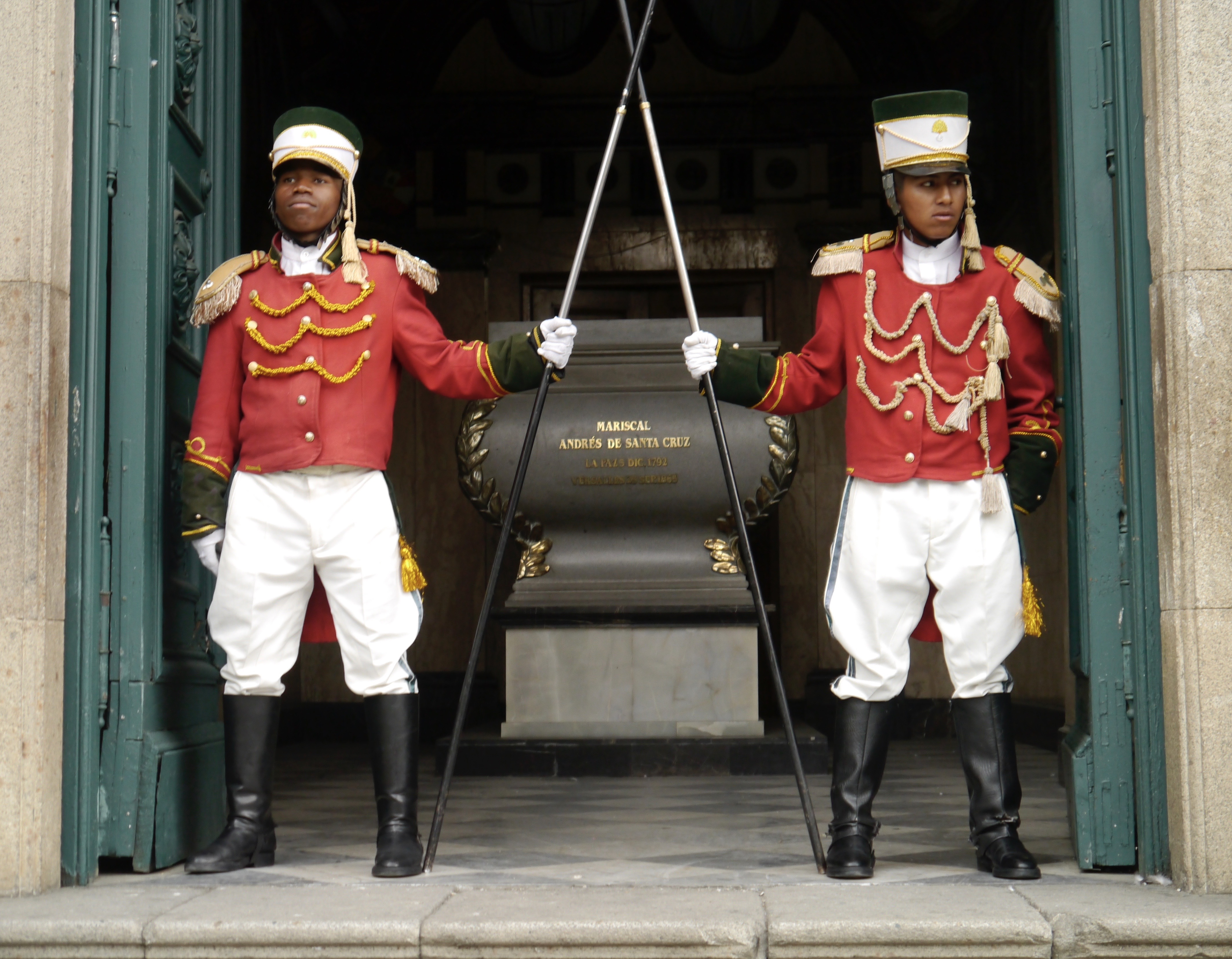
Members of the Colorados Regiment guard the tomb of Andrés de Santa Cruz in Cathedral Basilica of Our Lady of Peace, La Paz

The Cathedral Basilica of Our Lady of Peace (Spanish: Catedral Basílica de Nuestra Señora de La Paz), also called La Paz Cathedral, is a cathedral and minor basilica is located in Murillo Square in the city of La Paz in Bolivia. It was built in 1835 with a neoclassical architecture with Baroque elements. It has an interior consisting of five naves with different layers.

The first cathedral of La Paz was completed in 1692 after 70 years of construction; the first building was made of stone, lime and brick. In 1831 it was decided to demolish it due to the collapse of its presbytery and several cracks that threatened its collapse. The construction of the current cathedral began on March 24, 1835; it was inaugurated in 1925, marking the first centenary of the founding of the Republic of Bolivia. Although it opened that year, its interior ornamentation still continued until 1932.

In 1989, its two lateral towers were opened, this event coinciding with the visit of Pope John Paul II.

On the left side there is a chapel where the remains of Marshal Andrés de Santa Cruz, the supreme protector of the Peru-Bolivian Confederation, are kept.

== See also ==
- Roman Catholicism in Bolivia
- Cathedral Basilica of Our Lady of Peace

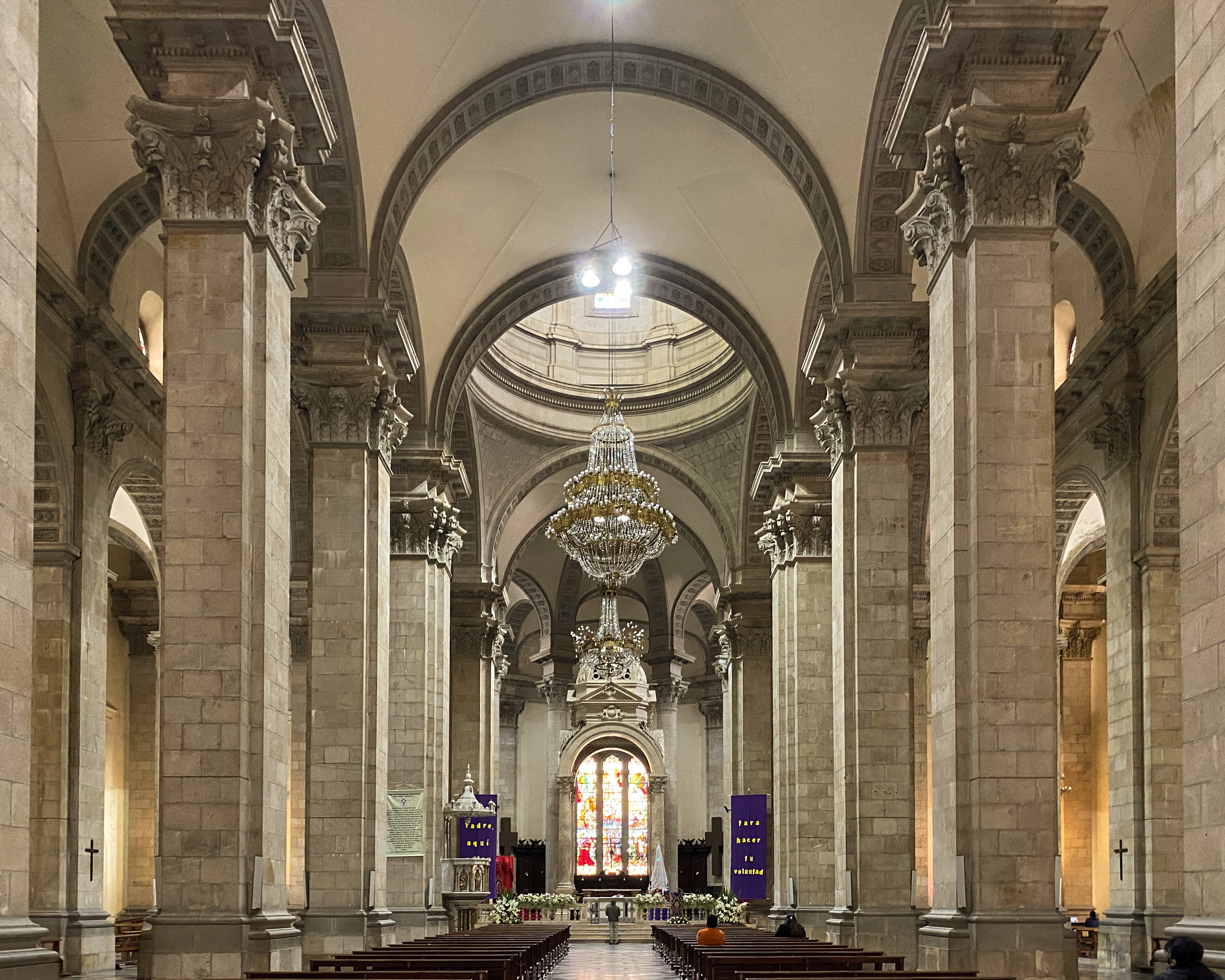
The nave of the cathedral
