= Atacama Province (1829–1839) =

Province of Bolivia (1829–1839)

Atacama
- Littoral Province of Bolivia
- 1829–1839
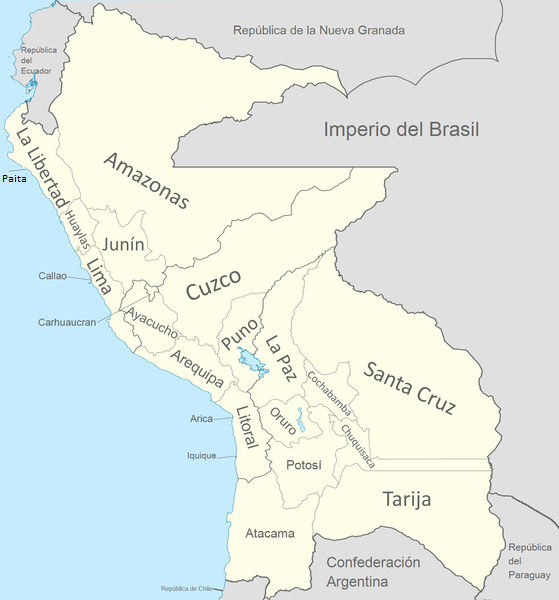
- Atacama within the confederation
- Capital: La Mar
- Historical era: Confederation
  - Created: 1 July 1829
  - Replaced: 26 October 1839
- Contained within
  - Constituent country: Bolivia
Preceded by	Succeeded by
Potosí Department	Litoral District

The Litoral Province of Atacama (Spanish: Provincia Litoral de Atacama), also known as Atacama Province (Spanish: Provincia de Atacama), was a littoral province of Bolivia that existed from 1829 to 1839, with its capital in the port of La Mar, named after José de la Mar, who fought at the battle of Ayacucho.

Starting in 1836, as part of the Bolivian State, it was under special administration of the Peru–Bolivian Confederation, since access to this territory was easier through a Peruvian port than by land through Bolivian territory.

== History ==
The Atacama Desert and the Puna in 1830.

On July 1, 1829, Bolivian President Andrés de Santa Cruz, by decree, created this new subnational entity, elevating the rank of the province of Atacama—until then a province of Potosí Department—into an independent province with a governor which responded directly to the president, thus reaching a hierarchy higher than a common province, but lower than a department, also having a senator as a representative before the Senate of Bolivia.

The Bolivia state generated income from this province from the export of silver and taxation of indigenous people. Much silver income was however lost due to smuggling networks which involved foreign merchants, corrupt officials and local indigenous people.

== See also ==
- Subdivisions of the Peru–Bolivian Confederation
- Bolivian Republic (Peru-Bolivian Confederation)
