= Port of Arica =

Port in Chile

Coordinates: 18.473°S 70.324°W

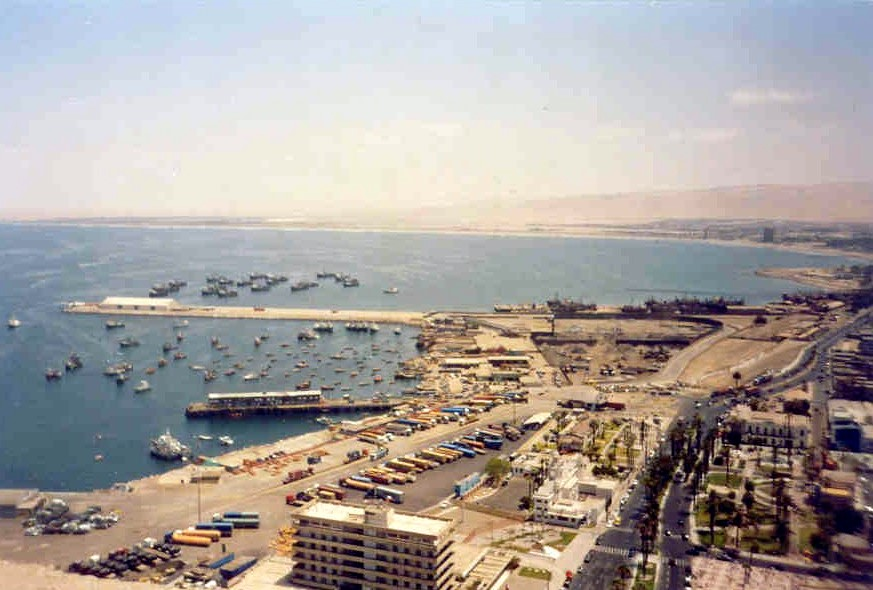
- View from the Morro de Arica
- Interactive map of Port of Arica
- Native name: Terminal Portuario de Arica (Spanish)

Location
- Country: Chile
- Location: Arica

Details
- Opened: February 14, 2000 (MASP)
- Operated by: ENAPU (MASP)
- Owned by: Peruvian State (MASP)
- Size: 185.445 m^{2}
- No. of berths: 2

The Port of Arica (Spanish: Puerto de Arica, Terminal Portuario de Arica; TPA) is the main port of the northernmost coastal Chilean city of Arica. The northern part of the port, known by its acronym, MASP Arica (Spanish: Muelle al servicio del Perú en Arica), is operated by the Peruvian State.

It is one of the six most active ports in Chile, alongside those of Iquique, Lirquén, San Antonio, San Vicente and Valparaíso.

== History ==
The city of Arica was originally part of the Viceroyalty of Peru. After the Peruvian War of Independence (1809–1826) it became part of the new Republic of Peru. The Republic of Peru's formation in 1821 before Bolivia which gained full independence in 1825 precluded any incorporation attempt of the port of Arica into Bolivia despite its importance for that country.

=== 19th century ===
When the Peru–Bolivian Confederation was established in 1836, the port city became the Common port of Arica (Spanish: Puerto común de Arica), under special administration of the Confederate government as per its constitution. The territory served as a common customs office for the member states of South Peru and Bolivia since June 21, 1836, when Andrés de Santa Cruz enabled the common port.

The measure came to harm the geopolitical importance of the port of Cobija, being one of the main causes of the decline of the only Bolivian port—which had been damaged due to the war between Salaverry and Santa Cruz—but on the other hand, it benefited Bolivian trade, due to the greater facilities it provided to merchants in the urban centres of the Bolivian state, especially from La Paz, Oruro and Cochabamba.

The port provided a great advantage to Bolivia, since the revenue from its customs office, not inconsiderable, half belonged to Bolivia. Furthermore, the Arica project went much further, since Andrés de Santa Cruz decreed that Arica would be a warehouse port to attract even more trade, with which he planned to end the supremacy of Valparaíso in the Pacific Ocean.

In Arica, there was awareness of the competition from Cobija, which despite its decline, continued to supply the urban centers of Potosí and Chuquisaca. Atanasio Hernández, Administrator of the Arica Customs on the Bolivian side and former Administrator of the Cobija Customs wrote to Santa Cruz suggesting the suppression of Cobija for the development of Arica, receiving a negative reply from Santa Cruz, who insisted on the port's political importance.

=== 20th century ===
The city of Arica, which had been occupied by the Chilean Army since the War of the Pacific, was formally ceded to Chile through the Treaty of Lima, signed in 1929. As per the treaty, the Chilean government agreed to the construction of a port to be operated by the Peruvian government with a degree of autonomy.

The Peruvian port was inaugurated on February 14, 2000. In 2005, the port, alongside other Peruvian-owned buildings in the city, became owned by the Regional Government of Tacna. It is serviced by the Tacna–Arica railway.

== See also ==
- Chile–Peru relations
- Casa Yanulaque
