= Department of Ayacucho (Peru–Bolivian Confederation) =

Department of the Peru–Bolivian Confederation

Department of Ayacucho Departamento de Ayacucho
- Department of South Peru
- 1836–1839
- Coat of arms

- Ayacucho within South Peru
- Capital: Ayacucho
- Historical era: Confederation
  - Established: 1836
  - Disestablished: 1839
- Contained within
  - Constituent country: South Peru
Preceded by	Succeeded by
Ayacucho Department	Ayacucho Department

The Department of Ayacucho (Spanish: Departamento de Ayacucho) was a department of South Peru, a constituent country of the Peru–Bolivian Confederation, which existed from 1836 to 1839. Created alongside the confederate state, its capital was Ayacucho.

== History ==
Ayacucho sent deputies to the Sicuani Assembly of March 1836, where the Constitution of the Southern Peruvian State was drafted under the guidance of the then rebel politician Nicolás Fernández de Piérola y Flores in the midst of the Peruvian civil war since 1835. The constitution proclaimed the state of South Peru and the alliance with the Bolivian occupation forces for the creation of the Peru-Bolivian Confederation.

With Piérola's victory, the Fundamental Law of 1837 in Tacna, with approval of the self-proclaimed supreme protector Andrés de Santa Cruz, recognized Ayacucho as a founding department of the Confederation. Ayacucho also had deputies in Congress as part of the South Peruvian parliamentary group.

Ayacucho was subject to the General Government, its governor was appointed by the president of the State, and this in turn was appointed by the supreme protector on duty. The governor was obliged to elect representatives of his department to participate in the assemblies of Sicuani, which were ordered by the president of the South Peruvian State.

== See also ==
- Subdivisions of the Peru–Bolivian Confederation
