= Department of Amazonas (Peru–Bolivian Confederation) =

Department of the Peru–Bolivian Confederation

Department of Amazonas Departamento de Amazonas
- Department of North Peru
- 1836–1839
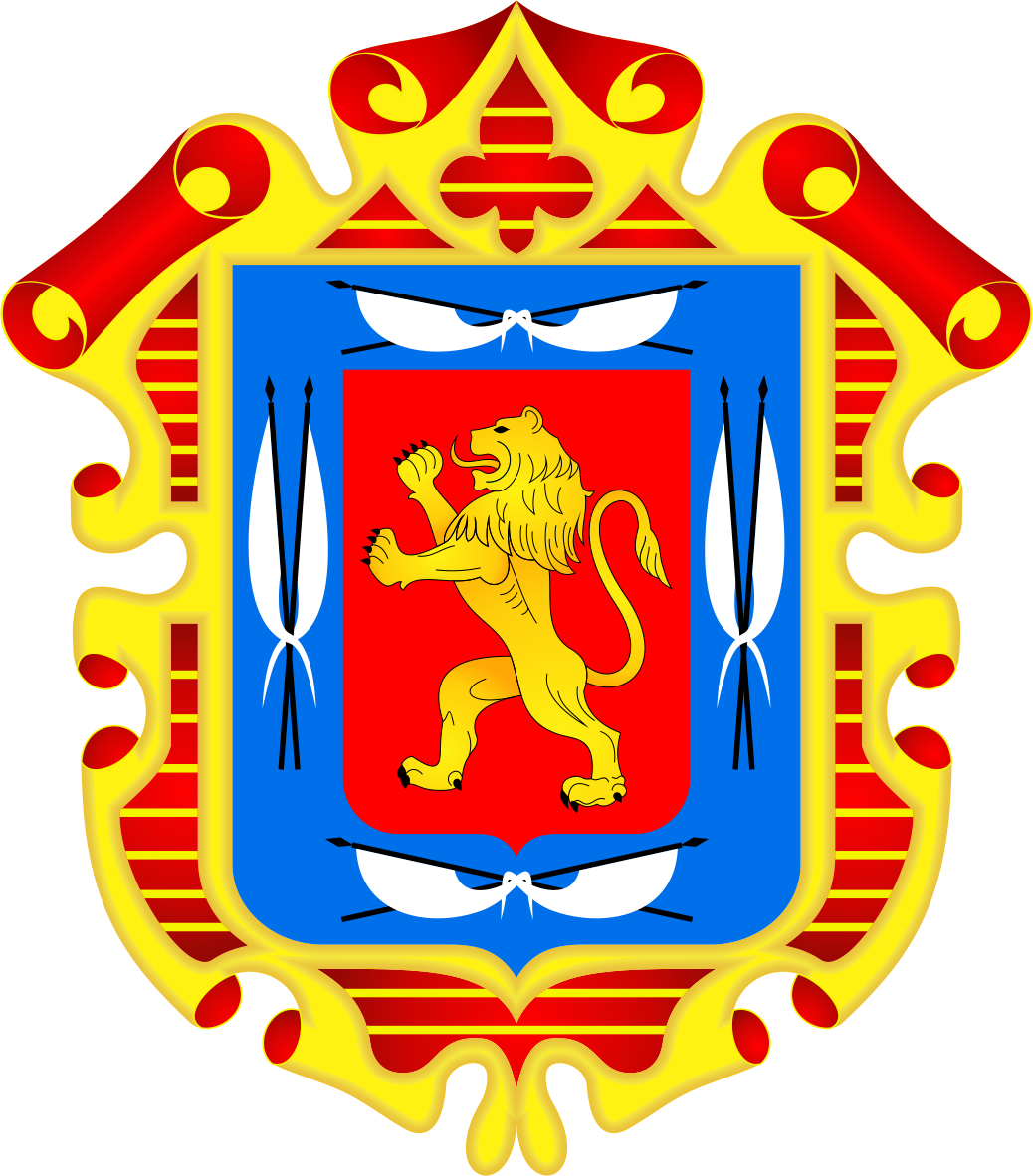
- Coat of arms

- Amazonas within North Peru
- Capital: Chachapoyas
- Government
- Prefect
  - 1836–1839: Damián Najar
- Historical era: Confederation
  - Established: 1836
  - Disestablished: 1839
- Contained within
  - Constituent country: North Peru
Preceded by	Succeeded by
Amazonas Department	Amazonas Department

The Department of Amazonas (Spanish: Departamento de Amazonas) was a department of North Peru, a constituent country of the Peru–Bolivian Confederation, which existed from 1836 to 1839. Created alongside the confederate state, its capital was Chachapoyas.

== History ==
Amazonas sent deputies to the Assembly of Huaura in August 1836, where the Constitution of the Northern Peruvian State was drafted under the guidance of the then rebel president Luis José de Orbegoso y Moncada in the midst of the Peruvian civil war since 1835. The constitution proclaimed the North-Peruvian State and the alliance with the Bolivian occupation forces for the creation of the Peru–Bolivian Confederation.

With the victory of Orbegoso, the Fundamental Law of 1837 in Tacna, with approval of the self-proclaimed supreme protector Andrés de Santa Cruz, recognized Amazonas as a founding department of the Confederation. Its sole representative, with the title of prefect, was Damián Nájar, who had previously acted as the governor of Maynas, as well as military commander of the same area. Nájar, originally from Guayaquil, was also elected deputy for Congress, alongside José Modesto Vega and Manuel Castro.

Amazonas was subject to the General Government, its governor was appointed by the president of the State, and this in turn was appointed by the supreme protector on duty. The governor was obliged to elect representatives of his department to participate in the Huaura assemblies, which were ordered by the president of the northern Peruvian State. Amazonas also had deputies in the Congress of the Confederation as part of the North-Peruvian parliamentary group.

The department was part of Luis José de Orbegoso's secessionist Peruvian Republic, declared in 1838.

== See also ==
- Subdivisions of the Peru–Bolivian Confederation
- Republic of North Peru
