= Ramón Herrera y Rodado =

Chilean politician and soldier

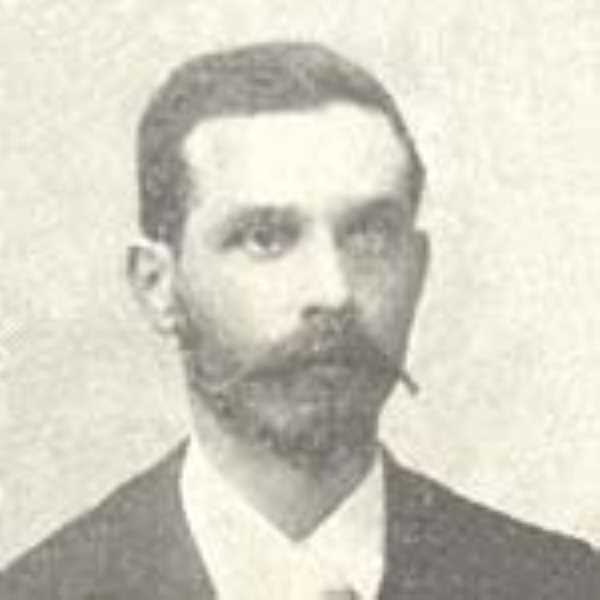

President of South Peru
- In office September 17, 1837 – October 12, 1838
- Preceded by: Pío de Tristán
- Succeeded by: Pío de Tristán

Personal details
- Born: December 7, 1799 Santiago, Captaincy General of Chile, Viceroyalty of Peru, Spanish Empire
- Died: 1882 Florence, Kingdom of Italy

Military service
- Allegiance: Spain; Patriot movement Peru–Bolivia
- Years of service: ?–1820; 1820–?
- Rank: Divisional general
- Unit: Numancia Battalion
- Battles/wars: Independence of Peru; War of the Confederation: Battle of Yungay

Ramón Herrera y Rodado (1799–1882) was a Chilean soldier who held important public positions in Peru during the government of José de la Riva Agüero and later during the Peru–Bolivian Confederation, being president of the South Peru and one of the trusted men of the protector Andrés de Santa Cruz.

== Biography ==
He was the son of the couple Francisco Manuel de Herrera and Francisca de Paula Rodado, both natives of Peninsular Spain. His family had moved to America when his father began a bureaucratic career as a Crime Prosecutor of the Real Audiencia of Buenos Aires in the Viceroyalty of the Río de la Plata in 1787, later holding the same position in the Captaincy General of Chile where in 1799 his son Ramón was born.

Following in the footsteps of his older brother Francisco de Paula Pedro Regalado, generally known as Pedro Herrera, he enlisted in the royalist army, later moving to Peru where he was part of the Concordia regiment stationed in Lima; His brother Pedro had died in 1816 in Chuquisaca, in the Battle of Tarabuco during the campaign of Viceroy Joaquín de la Pezuela in Upper Peru against the Army of the North.

In 1820 he served as captain of the Numancia battalion; Together with the Venezuelan captain Tomás de Heres he led the arrest of Colonel Ruperto Delgado and then handed this body over to the patriot side on the Huaura bridge, then becoming part of the United Liberating Army of Peru under the command of José de San Martín where he quickly rose to the rank of colonel. This event, one of the most decisive of the Liberating Expedition, allowed San Martín to increase his force with a veteran battalion and weakened the royalists to the same extent, who finally abandoned Lima. At the time Numancia went over to the patriots, it had 996 seats, of which 671 were Venezuelans and 325 Peruvians.

Decorated three times by San Martín and another three times by President Andrés de Santa Cruz; He was also Minister of War and Navy of Peru during the government of José de la Riva Agüero; Divisional general and Plenipotentiary Minister of Bolivia; President of the Government Council of South Peru and its Minister of War; finally elevated to President of the same country.

As President of South Peru, he was one of the negotiators of the Treaty of Paucarpata in 1837, which established peace between the Peru–Bolivian Confederation and the Republic of Chile, which was subsequently not recognized by the Chilean government; Once hostilities restarted, he fought in the Battle of Yungay where he commanded the Bolivian division of the Confederate Army. Once the war ended and Peru and Bolivia were plunged into anarchy, he went into self-exile, going to Argentina and Chile and then heading to Europe where he would live until the end of his days. During his stay in Peru he was married three times and had seven children.

...in August 1860, when I was in Brussels, an elderly but well-mannered gentleman introduced himself to me and, greeting me with the nickname "countryman" (paisano), told me that he was General Don Ramón Herrera, who was Chilean by birth and that He wanted to talk to me to ask me news about this country and his relatives. I did not deal with him again but then I learned that he owned valuable urban properties in Valparaíso, which he had acquired to give an advantageous and secure placement to his fortune.

— Chilean historian Diego Barros Arana

Away from public life, he would die in Florence, Italy when his native country and the other two he had served faithfully were still fighting in the War of the Pacific.

== See also ==
- Batallón Voltígeros de la Guardia
- War of the Confederation
