= Department of Junín (Peru–Bolivian Confederation) =

Department of the Peru–Bolivian Confederation

Department of Junín Departamento de Junín
- Department of North Peru
- 1836–1839
- Coat of arms

- Junín within North Peru
- Capital: Huancayo
- Historical era: Confederation
  - Established: 1836
  - Disestablished: 1839
- Contained within
  - Constituent country: North Peru
Preceded by	Succeeded by
Junín Department	Junín Department

The Department of Junín (Spanish: Departamento de Junín) was a department of North Peru, a constituent country of the Peru–Bolivian Confederation, which existed from 1836 to 1839. Created alongside the confederate state, its capital was Huancayo.

== History ==
Junín sent deputies to the Assembly of Huaura in August 1836, where the Constitution of the Northern Peruvian State was drafted under the guidance of the then rebel president Luis José de Orbegoso y Moncada in the midst of the Peruvian civil war since 1835. The constitution proclaimed the North-Peruvian State and the alliance with the Bolivian occupation forces for the creation of the Peru–Bolivian Confederation.

With the victory of Orbegoso, the Fundamental Law of 1837 in Tacna, with approval of the self-proclaimed supreme protector Andrés de Santa Cruz, recognized Junín as a founding department of the Confederation.

Junín was subject to the General Government, its governor was appointed by the president of the State, and this in turn was appointed by the supreme protector on duty. The governor was obliged to elect representatives of his department to participate in the Huaura assemblies, which were ordered by the president of the northern Peruvian State, where it was represented by Mariano Ocharán, Francisco Quirós, Pedro Alvarado, Ramón de Echenique, José Simeón Rodríguez Egusquiza and Mariano Rosario Córdova. Junín also had deputies in the Congress of the Confederation as part of the North-Peruvian parliamentary group.

== See also ==
- Subdivisions of the Peru–Bolivian Confederation
- Republic of North Peru
