= Department of Lima (Peru–Bolivian Confederation) =

Department of the Peru–Bolivian Confederation

Department of Lima Departamento de Lima
- Department of North Peru
- 1836–1839
- Coat of arms

- Lima within North Peru
- Capital: Lima
- Historical era: Confederation
  - Established: 1836
  - Disestablished: 1839
- Contained within
  - Constituent country: North Peru
Preceded by	Succeeded by
Department of Lima	Department of Lima

The Department of Lima (Spanish: Departamento de Lima) was a department of North Peru, a constituent country of the Peru–Bolivian Confederation, which existed from 1836 to 1839. Created alongside the confederate state, its capital was Lima.

== History ==
Lima sent deputies to the Assembly of Huaura in August 1836, where the Constitution of the Northern Peruvian State was drafted under the guidance of the then rebel president Luis José de Orbegoso y Moncada in the midst of the Peruvian civil war since 1835. The constitution proclaimed the North-Peruvian State and the alliance with the Bolivian occupation forces for the creation of the Peru–Bolivian Confederation.

With the victory of Orbegoso, the Fundamental Law of 1837 in Tacna, with approval of the self-proclaimed supreme protector Andrés de Santa Cruz, recognized Lima as a founding department of the Confederation.

Lima was subject to the General Government, its governor was appointed by the president of the State, and this in turn was appointed by the supreme protector on duty. The governor was obliged to elect representatives of his department to participate in the Huaura assemblies, which were ordered by the president of the northern Peruvian State. Lima also had deputies in the Congress of the Confederation as part of the North-Peruvian parliamentary group, such as Evaristo Gomes Sánchez, Francisco Rodríguez Piedra, Manuel Escobar, Lucas Fonseca and Juan Evangelista Vivas.

Lima, the capital city of both the department and of the constituent country, saw a number of events that led to both the beginning and the end of the confederation, such as Santa Cruz's triumphant entrance on August 15, 1836, and his decree establishing the entity on October 28, as well as the siege of the port of Callao and the battle between Confederates the United Restoration Army that established the secessionist North Peruvian state on August 21, 1838, until the Confederates occupied the city again.

== See also ==
- Subdivisions of the Peru–Bolivian Confederation
- Republic of North Peru
