= Tarija Department (Peru–Bolivian Confederation) =

Department of the Peru–Bolivian Confederation

Tarija Department Departamento de Tarija
- Department of Bolivia
- 1836–1839
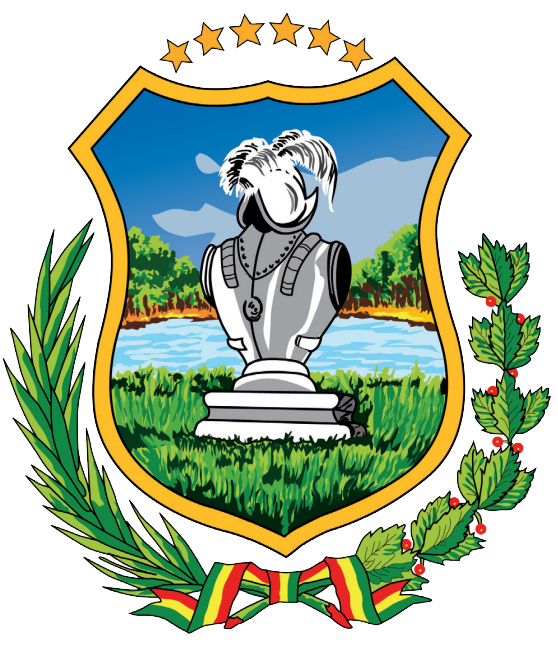
- Coat of arms

- Tarija within Bolivia
- Capital: Tarija
- Historical era: Confederation
  - Established: 1836
  - Tarija War: 1837–1839
  - Disestablished: 1839
- Contained within
  - Constituent country: Bolivia
Preceded by	Succeeded by
Potosí Department	Tarija Department

Tarija Department (Spanish: Departamento de Tarija) was a department of Bolivia, a constituent country of the Peru–Bolivian Confederation, with its capital in Tarija. A territory disputed between the Confederations of Peru–Bolivia and Argentina, it led to armed conflict in 1837, part of the broader War of the Confederation.

== History ==
After being part of the United Provinces of the Río de la Plata, the Bolivian government annexed it to its country, becoming one of the seven departments that made up the Bolivian State, belonging to the Peru-Bolivian Confederation, leading to a dispute with the United Provinces' successor state, the Argentine Confederation, as Tarija Province.

Initially, it was made up only of territory currently part of Argentina and Paraguay and two provinces: the Province of Tarija, and the Province of Salinas. During the war against the Argentine Confederation and the military occupation of territories in northern Argentina, new provinces were created administered by the Civil and Military Government of Tarija (Spanish: Gobierno Civil y Militar de Tarija).

Province	Capital
Tarija	Tarija
Salinas	Entre Ríos
Santa Catalina	Santa Catalina
Yavi	Yavi
Santa Victoria	Santa Victoria Oeste
San Pedro	El Puesto
Cochinoca	Abra Pampa
Susques	Pastos Chicos

== See also ==
- Subdivisions of the Peru–Bolivian Confederation
- Bolivian Republic (Peru-Bolivian Confederation)
