= Department of Huaylas (Peru–Bolivian Confederation) =

Department of the Peru–Bolivian Confederation

Department of Huaylas Departamento de Huaylas
- Department of North Peru
- 1836–1839
- Coat of arms

- Huaylas within North Peru
- Capital: Huarás
- Historical era: Confederation
  - Established: 1836
  - Disestablished: 28 February 1839
- Contained within
  - Constituent country: North Peru
Preceded by	Succeeded by
Department of Huaylas	Department of Ancash

The Department of Huaylas (Spanish: Departamento de Huaylas) was a department of North Peru, a constituent country of the Peru–Bolivian Confederation, which existed from 1836 to 1839. Created alongside the confederate state, its capital was Huaraz.

== History ==
On October 10, 1836, Marshal Andrés de Santa Cruz established the department of Huaylas, which had previously existed since its establishment by José de San Martín in 1821 to 1823, formed by the provinces of Santa (segregated from Lima), Conchucos Alto, Conchucos Bajo and Huaylas. Huarás remained as its capital.

The department was dissolved on February 28, 1839, when Agustín Gamarra changed its name from "Huaylas" to "Ancachs" (a name that legally remains, but is now written "Áncash") to commemorate the Chilean–Peruvian victory against the Confederate Army at the battle of Pan de Azúcar, on January 20, 1839. The date of February 28 currently serves to celebrate the "political creation" of Ancash (i.e. its renaming from "Huaylas").

== See also ==
- Subdivisions of the Peru–Bolivian Confederation
- Republic of North Peru
