= Republic of North Peru =

Constituent republic of the Peru-Bolivian Confederation (1836–1839)

Republic of North Peru República Nor-Peruana
- 1836–1839
- Flag Coat of arms

- North Peru within the Peru–Bolivian Confederation
- Capital: Lima
- Government: Presidential republic within a confederation
- President
  - 1837–1838: Luis José de Orbegoso
  - 1838–1839: José de la Riva Agüero
- History
  - Established: 11 August 1836
  - Confederation: 28 October 1836
  - Secession: 30 July 1838
  - Disestablished: 25 August 1839
Preceded by	Succeeded by
Peru	Peru
- Today part of: Peru; Brazil; Colombia; Ecuador

The Republic of North Peru was one of the three constituent republics of the short-lived Peru–Bolivian Confederation of 1836–1839.

North Peru was one of two states—the other being South Peru—that arose from the division of the Peruvian Republic due to the civil wars of 1834 and 1835 to 1836. The states were founded in 1836 to be constituent Republics of the planned Peru-Bolivian Confederation, alongside Bolivia.

The Confederation came to an end three years later after continuous border wars with Argentina and Chile in the War of the Confederation, and after a chaotic civil conflict between north and south Peruvians. In August of 1839, Agustín Gamarra declared the Confederation dissolved; as a result, South Peru and North Peru reverted to being a unified Republic of Peru.

== History ==
=== Background ===
After political instability in Peru and a coup d'état in 1835, a civil war broke out between newly self-declared president Felipe Santiago Salaverry and constitutional president Luis José de Orbegoso, who allowed Bolivian president Andrés de Santa Cruz to send his troops through the Peruvian border. After the latter's triumph in 1836, assemblies were soon established to make way for the creation of the Confederation, an idea that had been floating around since the era of independence.

=== Establishment ===
A constituent assembly known as the Huaura Assembly was held from 3 to 24 August 1836, and featured representatives from La Libertad, Lima, Huaylas, Maynas and Junín. On 11 August, North Peru was officially established through the promulgation of its constitution by the then President Orbegoso, naming Santa Cruz—who triumphantly entered Lima on 15 August—as the Supreme Protector of the state. Orbegoso also presented his resignation, but it was not approved by the assembly, who named him provisional president. The assembly also established the new territorial divisions of the country. Unlike its new southern neighbour, North Peru maintained the national symbols of its predecessor.

Provided, then, with all the legal elements granted by the assemblies of the three states, Santa Cruz decreed the establishment of the Peru-Bolivian Confederation, by decree given in Lima on 28 October 1836. A congress known today as the Congress of Tacna was ordered to meet in Tacna to establish the foundations of the confederation. The Pact of Tacna was signed without debate during the congress. It established the legal framework through which the state would operate, and also included the design of the Confederation's flag. Reactions to the pact were mixed even among its signatories, and disagreements led to the establishment of one constituent congress per member state. The act was later promulgated in 1837.

=== Development and dissolution ===
The Confederation generated resistance among several groups in both countries, which resented the dilution of national identities, and also among neighbouring countries. An important number of Peruvian politicians who opposed the Confederation, such as Agustín Gamarra and Ramón Castilla, fled to Chile where they received support, leading to the War of the Confederation.

After a trade war, the Congress of Chile approved the declaration of war on 26 December 1836, claiming that Santa Cruz's rule over Peru was illegitimate, and that his influence threatened the integrity of other South American nations, as seen by Orbegoso's support for an attempted invasion of Chile by Ramón Freire, specifically pointing out that it targeted then minister Diego Portales. Argentina followed suit after Juan Manuel de Rosas then declared war on the Confederation on 19 May 1837, after the escalation of a territorial conflict in its border, accusing Santa Cruz of harboring supporters of the Unitarian Party. The accusations ended up being true, as Santa Cruz had financially supported the émigrés.

South Peru was invaded from October to November, with the occupants being surrounded and forced to sign the a treaty, leaving the country shortly after. The treaty was declared null and void by Chile, and a second expedition headed by Manuel Bulnes was organized, which left for Peru on 19 July 1838. Around the same time, North Peru seceded from the Confederation on 30 July, but was nevertheless attacked and defeated by the second expedition in the Battle of Portada de Guías of 21 August.

During this time, the Confederation's stability collapsed, as by September, Peru (i.e. North and South Peru) was under the de jure control of seven different presidents at one time, of which six claimed control over North Peru (with the exception of Pío de Tristán in South Peru): Santa Cruz, who was the Supreme Protector; Gamara, the restorationist president; Orbegoso, leader of the secessionist North Peruvian state; José de la Riva Agüero, who replaced Orbegoso, being appointed by Santa Cruz; Domingo Nieto, in the north; and Juan Francisco de Vidal in Huaylas.

Santa Cruz occupied Lima on 10 November, ending the siege in Callao, but left for the north, where the restaurateurs were located. He was defeated in the Battle of Yungay on 20 January 1839, and thus, the Confederation was dissolved, with Gamarra announcing its dissolution on 25 August. The Confederate defeat led to the exile of Santa Cruz, first to Guayaquil, in Ecuador, then to Chile, and finally to Europe, where he died.

== Government ==
From 1837 until the confederation's dissolution, the state was controlled by a provisional president and a congress, both with limited powers and under the control of Marshal Andrés de Santa Cruz who was styled the supreme protector.

- First president: General Luis Orbegoso (21 August 1837 – 30 July 1838). He declared secession of the Republic of North Peru from the Peru-Bolivian Confederation on 30 July 1838 but continued as Provisional President until 1 September 1838
- Second president: General José de la Riva Agüero (11 August 1838 – 24 January 1839)

=== Administrative divisions ===
North Peru was divided into five departments which in turn were divided into provinces, and these into districts.

1. Amazonas Department
2. Huaylas Department
3. Junín Department
4. La Libertad Department
5. Lima Department

== See also ==
- Peru-Bolivian Confederation
- War of the Confederation

== Bibliography ==
- Basadre Grohmann, Jorge (2014). Historia de la República del Perú [1822-1933]. Vol. 2. El Comercio. ISBN 978-612-306-353-5.
- Tamayo Herrera, José (1985). Nuevo Compendio de Historia del Perú. Editorial Lumen.
