= Republic of South Peru =

Constituent republic of the Peru–Bolivian Confederation (1836–1839)

Republic of South Peru República Sur-Peruana
- 1836–1839
- Flag Coat of arms

- South Peru within the Confederation
- Capital: Tacna; 18°03′20″S 70°14′54″W
- Government: Presidential republic within a confederation
- President
  - 1837–1838: Ramón Herrera
  - 1838–1839: Pío de Tristán
- History
  - Established: 17 March 1836
  - Confederation: 28 October 1836
  - Occupied: October–November 1837
  - Disestablished: 25 August 1839
Preceded by	Succeeded by
Peru	Peru
- Today part of: Peru; Bolivia; Chile; Brazil

The Republic of South Peru (Spanish: República Sud-Peruana) was one of the three constituent Republics of the short-lived Peru–Bolivian Confederation of 1836–39.

South Peru was one of two states—the other being North Peru—that arose from the division of the Peruvian Republic due to the civil wars of 1834 and 1835 to 1836. The states were founded in 1836 to be constituent Republics of the planned Peru-Bolivian Confederation, alongside Bolivia.

The Confederation came to an end three years later after continuous border wars with Argentina and Chile in the War of the Confederation, and after a chaotic civil conflict between north and south Peruvians. In August 1839, Agustín Gamarra declared the Confederation dissolved; as a result, South Peru and North Peru reverted to being a unified Republic of Peru.

== History ==
=== Background ===
After political instability in Peru and a coup d'état in 1835, a civil war broke out between newly self-declared president Felipe Santiago Salaverry and constitutional president Luis José de Orbegoso, who allowed Bolivian president Andrés de Santa Cruz to send his troops through the Peruvian border. After the latter's triumph in 1836, assemblies were soon established to make way for the creation of the Confederation, an idea that had been floating around since the era of independence.

=== Establishment ===
A constituent assembly known as the Sicuani Assembly was established on March 16, 1836, and closed on March 22. It featured representatives from Ayacucho, Arequipa, Cuzco, Puno and Tacna. On April 10, Orbegoso recognized South Peru as an independent state through a decree, and a Supreme Court was installed in Cuzco on August 24. The assembly also created the country's flag and currency. Fines were put in place to prevent the (now North) Peruvian flag from being flown.

Provided, then, with all the legal elements granted by the assemblies of the three states, Santa Cruz decreed the establishment of the Peru-Bolivian Confederation, by decree given in Lima on October 28, 1836. A congress known today as the Congress of Tacna was ordered to meet in Tacna to establish the foundations of the confederation. The Pact of Tacna was signed without debate during the congress. It established the legal framework through which the state would operate, and also included the design of the Confederation's flag. Reactions to the pact were mixed event among its signatories, and disagreements led to the establishment of one constituent congress per member state. The act was later promulgated in 1837.

=== Development and dissolution ===
The Confederation generated resistance among several groups in both countries, which resented the dilution of national identities, and also among neighbouring countries. An important number of Peruvian politicians who opposed the Confederation, such as Agustín Gamarra and Ramón Castilla, fled to Chile where they received support, leading to the War of the Confederation.

After a trade war, the Congress of Chile approved the declaration of war on December 26, 1836, claiming that Santa Cruz's rule over Peru was illegitimate, and that his influence threatened the integrity of other South American nations, as seen by Orbegoso's support for an attempted invasion of Chile by Ramón Freire, specifically pointing out that it targeted then minister Diego Portales. Argentina followed suit after Juan Manuel de Rosas then declared war on the Confederation on May 19, 1837, after the escalation of a territorial conflict in its border, accusing Santa Cruz of harboring supporters of the Unitarian Party. The accusations ended up being true, as Santa Cruz had financially supported the émigrés.

South Peru was invaded from October to November under the nominal leadership of Antonio Gutiérrez de la Fuente as Supreme Chief of Peru., with the occupants being surrounded and forced to sign the a treaty, leaving the country shortly after. The treaty was declared null and void by Chile, and a second expedition headed by Manuel Bulnes was organized, which left for Peru on July 19, 1838. Around the same time, North Peru seceded from the Confederation on July 30, but was nevertheless attacked and defeated by the second expedition in the Battle of Portada de Guías of August 21.

During this time, the Confederation's stability collapsed. While Pío de Tristán continued to be president in South Peru and Santa Cruz continued to be the Supreme Protector, by September, they were two of other seven parallel presidents at one time: Gamara claimed to be the restorationist president, with his troops heading north; Orbegoso claimed the leadership of the secessionist North Peruvian state, now defeated; José de la Riva Agüero was appointed by Santa Cruz as Orbegoso's successor; Domingo Nieto claimed control in the north; and Juan Francisco de Vidal claimed control in Huaylas.

Santa Cruz headed for Lima, arriving on November 10, but left for the north, where the restaurateurs were located. He was defeated in the Battle of Yungay on January 20, 1839, and thus, the Confederation was dissolved, with Gamarra announcing its dissolution on August 25. The Confederate defeat led to the exile of Santa Cruz, first to Guayaquil, in Ecuador, then to Chile, and finally to Europe, where he died.

== Government ==
Departments of South Peru

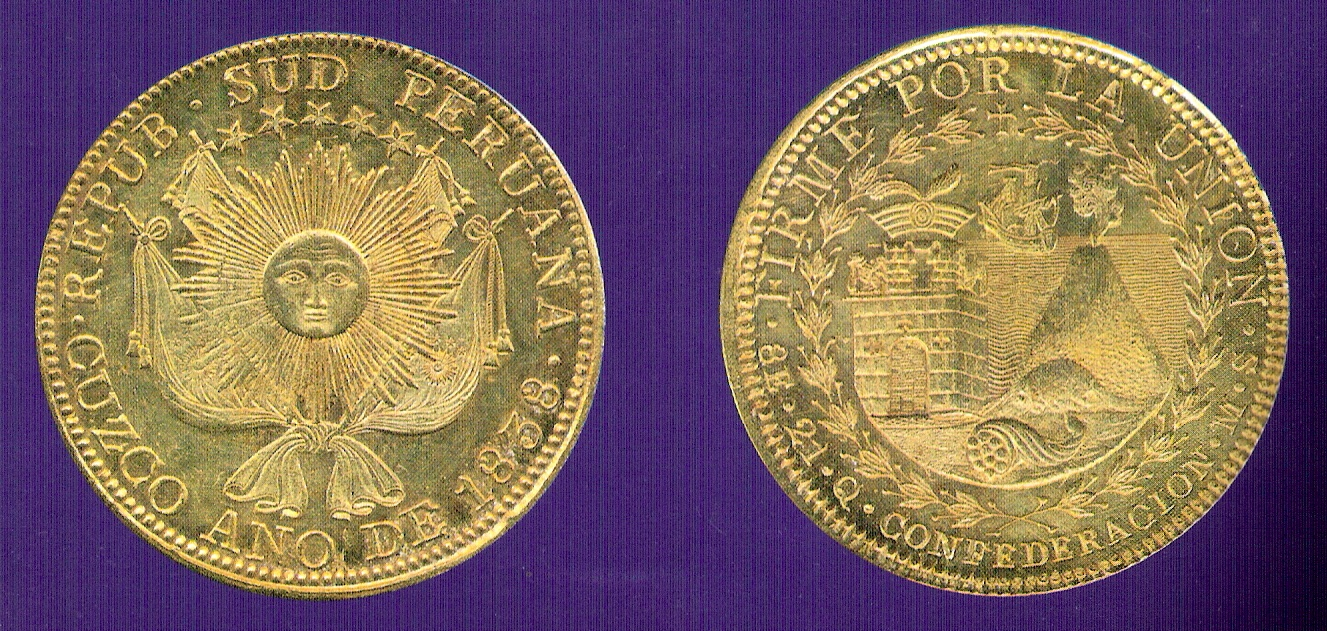
8 scudo golden coin. Its reverse depicts the coat of arms, and its obverse depicts Sacsayhuamán, its value, and the motto "Firme por la Unión".

From 1837 to its dissolution were a Provisional President and a Congress, both with limited powers and under the control of Marshal Andrés de Santa Cruz, who was styled the Supreme Protector.

- First President: General Ramón Herrera y Rodado (September 17, 1837 – October 12, 1838.)
- Second President: Juan Pío de Tristán y Moscoso (October 12, 1838 – February 23, 1839.)

=== Administrative divisions ===
South Peru was divided into five departments which in turn were divided into provinces, and these into districts.

On its foundation it consisted of four departments with their capitals in the cities of the same name. A fifth, Littoral, was added in 1837 with its capital at Tacna.

1. Arequipa Department
2. Ayacucho Department
3. Cuzco Department
4. Littoral Department
5. Puno Department

== See also ==
- Peru–Bolivian Confederation
- War of the Confederation (1836–1839)

== Bibliography ==
- Basadre Grohmann, Jorge (2014). Historia de la República del Perú [1822-1933]. Vol. 2. El Comercio. ISBN 978-612-306-353-5.
- Tamayo Herrera, José (1985). Nuevo Compendio de Historia del Perú. Editorial Lumen.
