= Department of Arequipa (Peru–Bolivian Confederation) =

Department of the Peru–Bolivian Confederation

Department of Arequipa Departamento de Arequipa
- Department of South Peru
- 1836–1839
- Coat of arms

- Arequipa within South Peru
- Capital: Arequipa
- Historical era: Confederation
  - Established: 1836
  - Disestablished: 1839
- Contained within
  - Constituent country: South Peru
Preceded by	Succeeded by
Department of Arequipa	Department of Arequipa

The Department of Arequipa (Spanish: Departamento de Arequipa) was a department of South Peru, a constituent country of the Peru–Bolivian Confederation, which existed from 1836 to 1839. Created alongside the confederate state, its capital was Arequipa.

== History ==
Arequipa sent deputies to the Sicuani Assembly of March 1836, where the Constitution of the Southern Peruvian State was drafted under the guidance of the then rebel politician Nicolás Fernández de Piérola y Flores in the midst of the Peruvian civil war since 1835. The constitution proclaimed the state of South Peru and the alliance with the Bolivian occupation forces for the creation of the Peru-Bolivian Confederation.

With Piérola's victory, the Fundamental Law of 1837 in Tacna, with approval of the self-proclaimed supreme protector Andrés de Santa Cruz, recognized Arequipa as a founding department of the Confederation. The General Government of the Confederation minimized the territorial dispute between the then Peruvian Republic and Bolivia.

Arequipa was subject to the General Government, its governor was appointed by the president of the State, and this in turn was appointed by the supreme protector on duty. The governor was obliged to elect representatives of his department to participate in the assemblies of Sicuani, which were ordered by the president of the South Peruvian State.

During the War of the Confederation, a military expedition of the United Restoration Army, known as the first "Restorative Expedition," left Valparaíso on September 15, 1837, landing in Quilca, and occupying Arequipa on October 12. On November 17, after the Chileans were surrounded by Peruvian troops, the Treaty of Paucarpata was signed by Manuel Blanco Encalada under the guarantee of Great Britain, through which the occupation was undone six days later and the Peruvian ships captured by Chile were to be returned. After Blanco Encalada's troops arrived in Valparaíso, he was met with hostile demonstrations and the Chilean government repudiated the treaty.

== See also ==
- Subdivisions of the Peru–Bolivian Confederation
- Republic of South Peru
