= Bolivian Colorados Regiment =

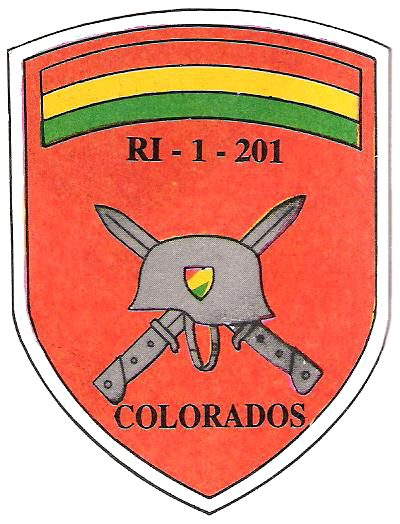
Emblem of the Colorados Regiment

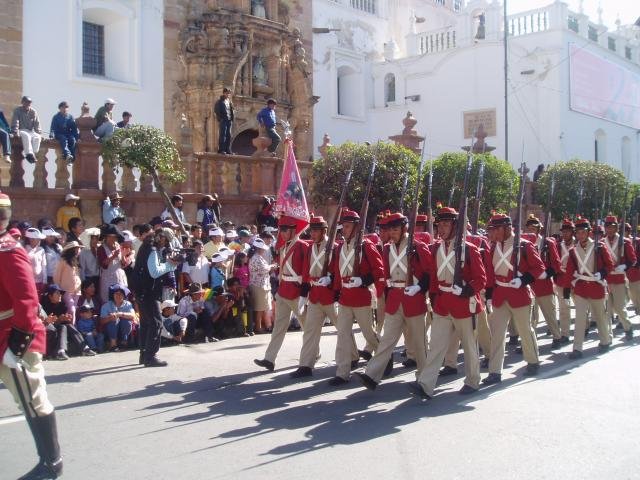
Bolivian Colorados regiment during a parade in the city of Sucre, Bolivia.

The 1st Regiment of Foot Infantry "Bolivian Colorados" National Presidential Escort Regiment (Regimiento 1ro. de Infanteria "Colorados de Bolivia") of the Bolivian Army, formerly the 39th Line Infantry Battalion "Colorados" is one of the Army's oldest and most prestigious infantry regiments. It is headquartered in La Paz's Miraflores District, and is under the direct supervision of Bolivian Army headquarters.

Established in 1821, this regiment is mostly a ceremonial unit, being the escort security regiment of the President of Bolivia. This is the Bolivian Army's most represented unit, having a close connection with the Bolivian people, whatever their race, and has a contribution to national history.

== Organization ==
The Colorados Regiment contains two infantry battalions; the BI-201 (Protocol Unit) and BI-202 (Security) with their respective headquarters. The headquarters Calama is located in the street of the same name, which operates the unit headquarters and recruitment center. The Mirador headquarters in the hill of Quilli Quilli, Pavón Villa area, is a center for training in various areas of specialization such as assault, support, personal protection, first aid, etc.

== History ==
=== Raising of the Colorados ===
The Regiment was raised in 1821 as the nation, then as part of both the Viceroy of Lima and the then United Provinces of the Rio del Plata, was fighting the Spanish American wars of independence as guerrilla units siding with the Buenos Aires and Lima independent governments then.

In 1821, the Colorados Regiment's first references were to a militia unit led by the Upper Peru guerrilla leader, Jose Miguel Lanza, and had among its rosters future national heroes of Bolivia like Jose Ballivian, Mariano Torrelio, and Manuel Deheza, who were fighting for Upper Peru's independence from Spain. Lanza's men led the way for the liberation of northern Upper Peru in 1825-26.

=== The 1850s and 1860s ===
It was in 1857 when the Colorados made their appearance as the 39th Line Infantry Battalion "Colorados" under the leadership of then regimental commander Placido Yanez. It was the Bolivian Army's elite infantry unit, and was known then for its extreme discipline. Col. Yanez made the regiment's famous slogan: "The love of the arms enters the heart".

By then, the battalion would begin to be the principal unit of the Bolivian Army, and under the administration of President Hilarion Daza it became the presidential escort and security unit. It would later earn the nickname "Daza's Colorados" for this reason alone. It was then composed of 570 personnel. Most of them were his friends and relatives, all but sometimes members of the Bolivian Army as enlisted personnel and non-commissioned officers while only a few were officers.

=== War of the Pacific: Actions at Tacna ===
During the War of the Pacific, Bolivia alongside Peru, fought for their respective nations' mining interests against the Chilean forces. Bolivia's contributions to the war included 2 cavalry squadrons, an artillery battery, and three infantry battalions, all equipped with fusils and rifles, among them being the Bolivian Colorados. They formed the Bolivian Army under President Daza's leadership as Commander in Chief.

As part of the combined Bolivian-Peruvian Allied Army, the Bolivian Colorados contributed their hard work to bring victory to the combined armies, at the cost of many lives. The Colorados were in action in some of the great battles of the war, including the Battle of San Francisco (also known as Battle of Dolores) where the Camarones betrayal happened, and the Battle of Tacna, where it was listed and then renamed as the 1st Alliance Infantry Battalion, now part of the forces under the new army chief President Narciso Campero. Most of the time however, before the fighting in Tacna, it was always on the reserve, due to the belated formations of infantry battalions.

May 26 is Infantry Day in Bolivia in recognition of the Colorados' bravery throughout the whole battle of Tacna, led by regimental commander Colonel Ildefonso Murguia Anze and regimental drummer Juan Pinto. This battle was where the Colorados shouted their battle cry: Temblad rotos, que aqui entran los Colorados de Bolivia! (Rotos, be shaken, because the Colorados of Bolivia have come!) and formed a gallant defense alongside their Peruvian allies. Every year (except in 2009) the Colorados come back to the place of their glorious exploits to commemorate the Bolivians' gallantry and courage seen in this battle.

In 2004, through Law 2922 of President of Bolivia Carlos Mesa, the Regiment's actions in Tacna were rewarded with all who were in the Regiment in that battle serving under the colors were officially declared as National Heroes of Bolivia.

=== Actions in Acre ===
As part of the National Army of Bolivia in 1903 (led by the President of Bolivia Jose Manuel Pando), it fought in the Acre War for Bolivian control of that region.

=== The War for the Chaco: Bravery in Cañada Strongest ===
Its second act of bravery to the flag was, when in the Battle of Cañada Strongest during the Chaco War, the Bolivian Colorados, now a full regiment of infantry, fought against the Paraguayan army and came out in triumph, having captured the 3rd Btn., Lomas Valentinas Regiment of the Paraguayan Army. It also took part in other Bolivian actions during the war.

=== Guerrilla wars in the 1960s ===
As one of the Bolivian Army's missions is for internal security, it is no wonder that the Colorados were involved in anti-guerrilla operations, supported by the United States, against the guerrillas led by Che Guevara in 1967 in places like Nancahuazu, Ovelo, El Espino, and many others.

== Regimental Motto ==
Traditionally, Subordinacion y Constancia, ¡Viva Bolivia! (Subordination and Steadfastness. Long Live Bolivia!) is the regimental motto, and concurrently that of the Armed Forces of Bolivia, but in 2010 ¡Patria o Muerte, Venceremos! (Fatherland or Death, we'll triumph!), the slogan made famous by Ernesto Che Guevara, became the new motto by President Evo Morales, in line with the socialist stance of his government and party. Among the opposition, the change of motto to the socialist one used by him in 1967 during his guerrilla war in the country has been met with criticism, even among former armed forces chiefs. Che brought the motto to Bolivia during his guerrilla campaigns here. However it would be abandoned at large by the Armed Forces in 2019.

During Hugo Chavez's visit to Cochabamba on April 22, 2010, the Colorados formed the guard of honor during the arrival ceremonies. When he shouted Patria o Muerte twice, the Colorados didn't respond or say a word.

The regiment's other motto is A paso de vencedores, Temblad rotos, que aqui entran los Colorados de Bolivia, Vencer o Morir, carajo! (To the pace of the victorious, Be shaken, Rotos, for because the Colorados of Bolivia have come, Victory or Death, bastards!)

Presently the motto has been reinstated in the Armed Forces but in the light of the bigger struggle for the recovery of the nation's right for access to the Pacific Ocean, which was lost during the War of the Pacific, is now amended to: Subordinacion y Constancia, ¡Viva Bolivia, hacia el Mar! (Subordination and Steadfastness. Long Live Bolivia, up to the Sea!)

== Regimental arms and colour guidons ==
The arms is round with a picture of a kneeling soldier of the Colorados in full dress uniform in the middle, with a rainbow above him. The new regimental colour guidon (since 2010) has the arms in the center, in the middle of the national colors of the Wiphala, the new colour of the Bolivian Armed Forces, and also has the regiment's foundation date (and the year of the new guidon when it was received) in white lettering below the heraldic arms. The regiment's second guidons (for companies) is in red with the standard arms of Bolivian infantry regiments: a Stahlhelm with the national flag (and nowadays a sticker of the Wiphala) on top in the middle of two crossed sabres, with the regiment's title surrounding it, written in white lettering.

== Regimental dress uniform ==
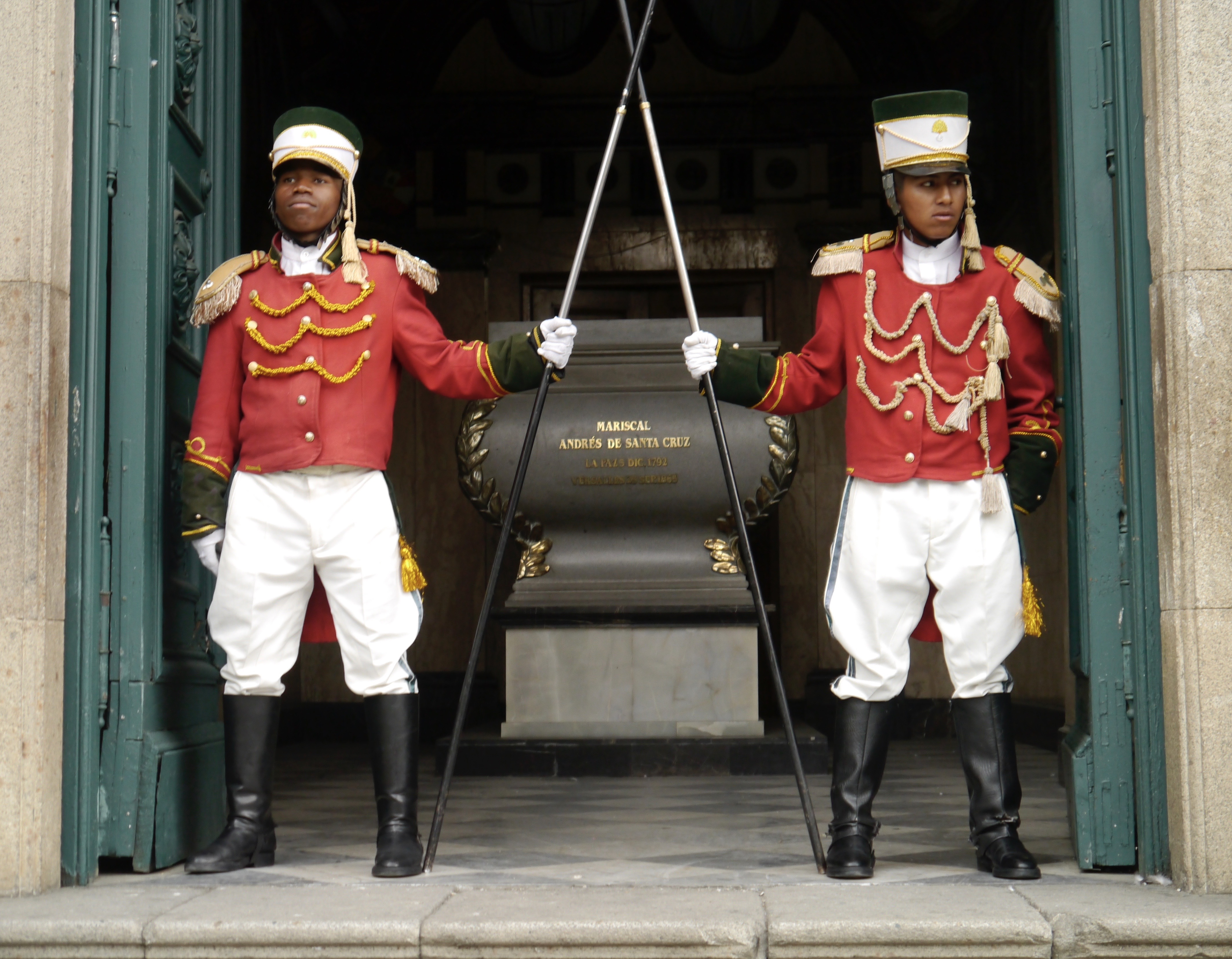
Members of the Colorado Regiment guard the tomb of Andrés de Santa Cruz in La Paz

The dress uniform of the Colorados is a red long sleeved standing collar tunic with a red small kepi hat, epaulette, sword strap and set (for officers), long khaki-tan trousers and black boots.

== See also ==
- Armed Forces of Bolivia
- Presidential Guard Battalion (Brazil)
- Regiment of Mounted Grenadiers
- La Moneda Palace Guard
- Presidential Life Guard Dragoons Regiment
