= Peru–Bolivian Confederation =

State in western South America from 1836 to 1839

Coordinates: 13.4°S 68.9°W

Peru–Bolivian Confederation Confederación Perú–Boliviana
- 1836–1839
- Flag Emblem
- Motto: Firme por la Unión "Firm for the Union"
- Anthem: Himno Nacional del Perú (Note: De facto.) "National Anthem of Peru"
- Map of the Peru–Bolivian Confederation (including territorial claims)
- Capital: Tacna
- Official languages: Spanish
- Recognised regional languages: Quechua; Aymara; Guarani; Other Indigenous languages
- Constituent countries: North Peru; South Peru; Bolivia; North Peru (autonomous); Iquicha (autonomous); Port of Arica
- Government: Confederated presidential republic
- Supreme Protector
  - 1836–1837: Andrés de Santa Cruz
  - 1837: Pío de Tristán (interim)
  - 1837–1839: Andrés de Santa Cruz
- History
  - Established by decree: 28 October 1836
  - Pact of Tacna: 1 May 1837
  - Battle of Yungay: 20 January 1839
  - Dissolution declared (Note: Agustín Gamarra first declared the Confederation dissolved on 25 August, while José Miguel de Velasco later declared the confederation dissolved on 26 October 1839.): 25 August 1839
  - Capitulation of Iquicha: 15 November 1839

Population
  - 1835–1836 estimate: 2,434,513
- Currency: Peruvian real, Bolivian sol
Preceded by	Succeeded by
Peru; Bolivia	Peru; Bolivia
- Today part of: Peru; Bolivia; Argentina; Brazil; Chile; Colombia; Ecuador; Paraguay

The Peru–Bolivian Confederation (Spanish: Confederación Perú–Boliviana) was a short-lived state that existed in South America between 1836 and 1839. The country was a loose confederation made up of three states: North Peru, South Peru, and the Bolivian Republic. North Peru and South Peru had emerged from the division of the Peruvian Republic due to the Peruvian Civil War of 1834 and the Salaverry-Santa Cruz War of 1835–36.

The geographical limits of the Confederation varied over time, with Bolivia occupying and incorporating certain disputed territories in northern Argentina in 1838. It also possessed de facto autonomous indigenous territories, such as Iquicha, all under the supreme command of Marshal Andrés de Santa Cruz, who assumed the position of Supreme Protector in 1836, while he was president of Bolivia.

Although its institutional creation arose on 1 May 1837, with the Pact of Tacna, its de facto establishment dated from 28 October 1836, with the end of the Salaverry-Santa Cruz War, and lasted until 25 August 1839, with its dissolution proclaimed by General Agustín Gamarra, the Peruvian restorationist president who declared war against the Confederation, supported by the United Restoration Army headed by himself and Chilean Manuel Bulnes—formerly the Restoration Army of Peru—made up of Peruvian and Bolivian opponents of the Confederation, as well as the governments and armies of Chile and Argentina. Both Chile and Argentina opposed the Confederation as a potential military and economic threat, and for its support for dissidents in exile.

Argentina and Bolivia reached an agreement after their war over Tarija, and the Confederate Army was ultimately defeated by the United Restoration Army in the 1839 Battle of Yungay, which put an end to the War of the Confederation. Historian Jorge Basadre frames the confederation as part of a period of "determination of the nationalities" in western South America.

== History ==
=== Background ===
At the beginning of the 19th century, Simón Bolívar postulated the idea of creating a great nation, coinciding with Andrés de Santa Cruz, who thought of uniting Peru and Bolivia in a single country, the latter colloquially known as Upper Peru. The idea of uniting both countries was the general idea of several influential political leaders in Peru—including Francisco Xavier de Luna Pizarro, José María Pando, Manuel Lorenzo de Vidaurre, Agustín Gamarra, among others—who sought to reintegrate the two Perus, disagreeing only in the form of the "union": confederation or merger. An important factor in the desire to unite these two states were the historical ties between both regions, even after independence.

After political instability and a coup d'état in 1835, a civil war broke out between newly self-declared president Felipe Santiago Salaverry and constitutional president Luis José de Orbegoso, who allowed Bolivian president Andrés de Santa Cruz to send his troops through the Peruvian border. After the latter's triumph in 1836, assemblies were soon established to make way for the creation of the Confederation.

=== Prelude ===
Two constituent congresses were established in each of the three founding states of the confederation, in the cities of Huaura (North Peru), Sicuani (South-Peru) and Tapacarí (Bolivia). Immediately, the representatives of the three states promised to celebrate the union pact of the Peru–Bolivian Confederation as soon as possible.

The Sicuani Assembly was established on 16 March 1836, and closed on 22 March. It featured representatives from Ayacucho, Arequipa, Cuzco, Puno and Tacna. On 10 April, Orbegoso recognized South Peru as an independent state through a decree, and a Supreme Court was installed in Cuzco on 24 August. The assembly also created the country's flag and currency. Fines were put in place to prevent the (now North) Peruvian flag from being flown.

The Huaura Assembly lasted from 3 to 24 August 1836, and featured representatives from La Libertad, Lima, Huaylas, Maynas and Junín. On 11 August, North Peru was officially established through the promulgation of its constitution by the then President Orbegoso, naming Santa Cruz—who triumphantly entered Lima on 15 August—as the Supreme Protector of the state. Orbegoso also presented his resignation, but it was not approved by the assembly, who named him provisional president. The assembly also established the new territorial divisions of the country. Unlike its new southern neighbour, North Peru maintained the national symbols of its predecessor.

In the case of Bolivia, a special session of the Tapacarí Congress had previously been held on 21 June 1836, which authorized Santa Cruz to complete the confederation project to which Bolivia had already adhered with the Law of 22 July 1835. Around that time, Santa Cruz received the diploma and insignia of Grand Officer of the Legion of Honour, with which the King of France honored him. He also received a communication from Pope Gregory XVI and a rosary with his medal, blessed by the Pope himself.

=== Establishment ===
Provided, then, with all the legal elements granted by the assemblies of the three states, Santa Cruz decreed the establishment of the Peru–Bolivian Confederation, by decree given in Lima on 28 October 1836. A congress known today as the Congress of Tacna (Spanish: Congreso de Tacna) was ordered to meet in Tacna to establish the foundations of the confederation. A customs office was also opened in Arica, which employed both South Peruvians and Bolivians.

During the meeting, Santa Cruz arranged for each state to send a priest, a soldier and a lawyer as delegates before, and consequently, three religious, three lawyers and three soldiers marched to Tacna. The nine delegates were as follows:

- Representing North Peru
  - Tomás Diéguez de Florencia, bishop of Trujillo
  - Manuel Tellería Vicuña, lawyer and member of the Supreme Court
  - Francisco Quirós y Ampudia, colonel
- Representing South Peru
  - José Sebastián de Goyeneche y Barreda, bishop of Arequipa
  - Pedro José Flórez, lawyer and judge of Ayacucho
  - Juan José Larrea, colonel
- Representing Bolivia
  - José María Mendizábal, bishop of La Plata
  - Pedro Buitrago, lawyer and member of the Supreme Court
  - Miguel María de Aguirre, colonel

Initially, 24 January 1837, was chosen as the congress' date, but it had to be postponed. Santa Cruz decided to accompany the plenipotentiaries of the North-Peruvian State, for which reason he left Lima and embarked on the frigate Flora on 9 February, but instead of disembarking in Islay, he went to Arica, where he arrived on 27 February. The congress was postponed to 18 April; Meanwhile, Santa Cruz remained in Arica, but on 2 March he headed for Tacna, where he was received with much fanfare. From Tacna he went to Viacha on 10 March, arriving in La Paz the following day. There, together with the Bolivian plenipotentiaries Aguirre and Buitrago, and Bolivian Vice President Mariano Enrique Calvo, he agreed on the project that should be discussed and approved in Tacna. Then, in the first days of April, he went down to Tacna again.

On 18 April 1837, the Tacna Congress was inaugurated, with the presence of the nine delegates. The Pact of Tacna (Spanish: Pacto de Tacna) was signed without debate during the congress. It established the legal framework through which the state would operate, and also included the design of the flag. Reactions to the pact were mixed event among its signatories, and disagreements led to the establishment of one constituent congress per member state. The act was later promulgated in 1837.

=== Political instability and wars ===
Like Orbegoso, Santa Cruz also had many opponents and enemies born in the frequent caudillo clashes of the early years of Peru's republican history. Among those enemies were powerful characters such as Agustín Gamarra and Ramón Castilla, who at the time were exiled in Chile.

The rivalry that existed between the ports of Callao and Valparaíso worsened as a result of the establishment of the Confederation. A tariff war soon began between both states, and Orbegoso supported Ramón Freire's failed expedition against Diego Portales. The Congress of Chile approved the declaration of war on 26 December 1836, claiming that Santa Cruz's rule over Peru was illegitimate, and that his influence threatened the integrity of other South American nations, as seen by Orbegoso's support for the attempted invasion of Chile by Freire, specifically pointing out the attempt on Portales.

A territorial dispute between Argentina and Bolivia over the territory of Tarija escalated, as Bolivia occupied and annexed the territory and Juan Manuel de Rosas then declared war on the Confederation on 19 May 1837, accusing Santa Cruz of harboring supporters of the Unitarian Party. The accusations ended up being true, as Santa Cruz had financially supported the émigrés.

Portales was assassinated in Valparaíso after a mutiny broke out in Quillota, leading to preparations for the invasion of South Peru. Thus, the first "Restorative Expedition" left Valparaíso on 15 September 1837, landing in Quilca, and occupying Arequipa on 12 October, establishing a local government on 17 October. The Confederate Navy captured the Juan Fernández Islands on 14 November.

On 17 November, after the Chileans were surrounded by Peruvian troops, the Treaty of Paucarpata was signed by Manuel Blanco Encalada under the guarantee of Great Britain, through which the occupation was undone six days later and the Peruvian ships captured by Chile were to be returned. After Blanco Encalada's troops arrived in Valparaíso, he was met with hostile demonstrations and the Chilean government repudiated the treaty of Paucarpata. A second expedition headed by Manuel Bulnes was organized, which left for Peru on 19 July 1838.

=== Dissolution ===
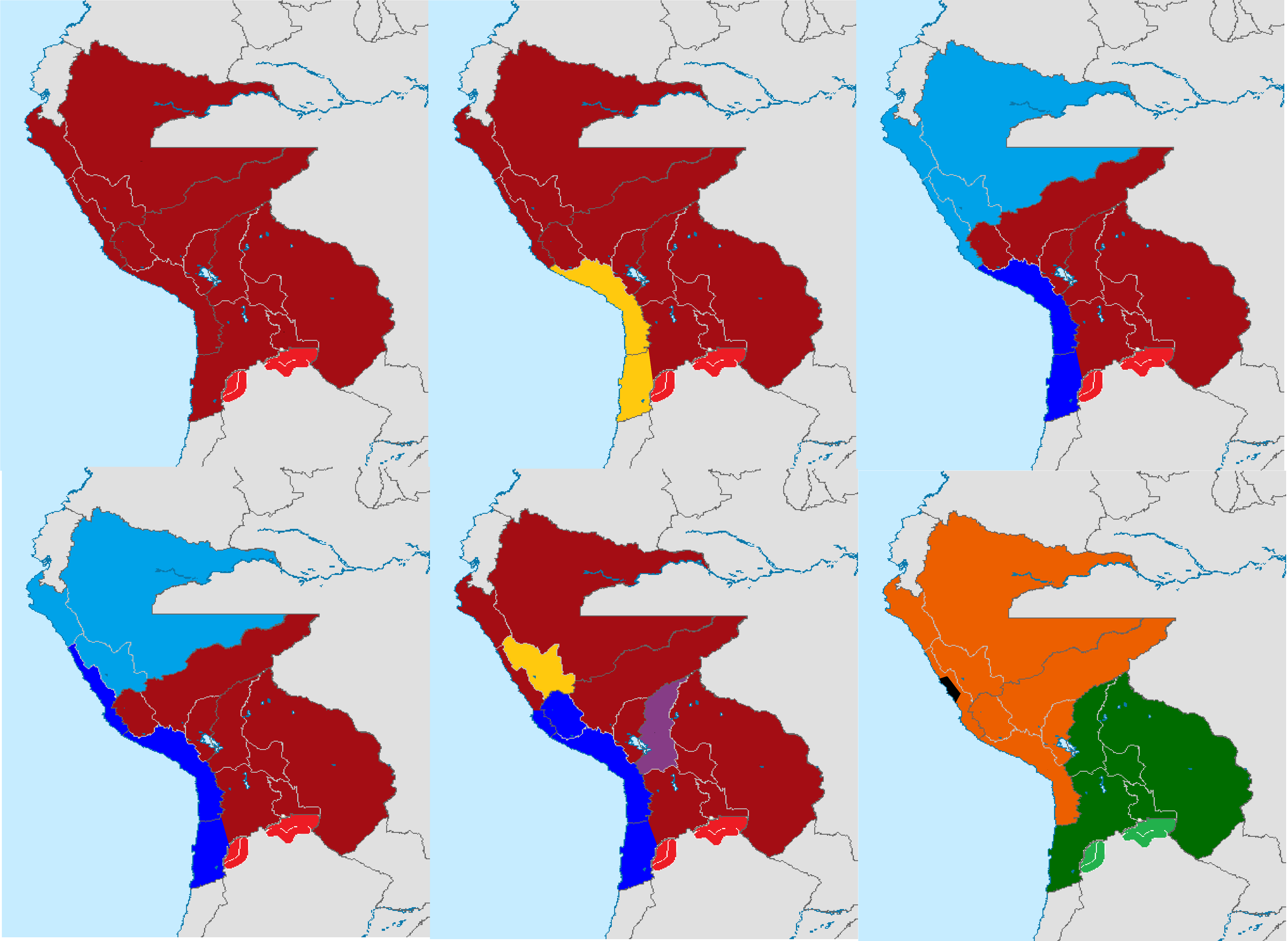
Dissolution of the Peru–Bolivian Confederation: Peru–Bolivian Confederation Controlled by the United Restoration Army First Provisional Government of Peru Northern Peruvian Republic Second Provisional Government of Peru Provisional Government of Bolivia New Peruvian State New Bolivian State Controlled by the United Restoration Army during the restoration De facto borders after the dissolution Disputed between Peru-Bolivia and Argentina Disputed between Bolivia and Argentina

Around the same time, North Peru seceded from the Confederation on 30 July, but was nevertheless attacked and defeated by the United Restoration Army in the Battle of Portada de Guías of 21 August. Meanwhile, Confederate troops in Callao were besieged by the same army.

During this time, the Confederation's stability collapsed, as by September, Peru (i.e. North and South Peru) was under the de jure control of seven different presidents at one time: Santa Cruz, who was the Supreme Protector; Gamara, the restorationist president; Orbegoso, leader of the secessionist North Peruvian state; José de la Riva Agüero, who replaced Orbegoso, being appointed by Santa Cruz; Pío de Tristán, president of South Peru; Domingo Nieto, in the north; and Juan Francisco de Vidal in Huaylas.

Santa Cruz occupied Lima on 10 November, ending the siege in Callao, but left for the north, where the restaurateurs were located. He was defeated in the Battle of Yungay on 20 January 1839, and thus, the Confederation was dissolved, with Gamarra announcing its dissolution on 25 August. The Confederate defeat led to the exile of Santa Cruz, first to Guayaquil, in Ecuador, then to Chile, and finally to Europe, where he died.

After the Confederation was defeated, loyalists such as Antonio Huachaca kept fighting against the new Peruvian government, being also defeated in November 1839.

== Government and politics ==
According to the Fundamental law of the Peru–Bolivian Confederation (Spanish: Ley fundamental de la Confederación Perú–Boliviana) signed on 18 April 1837, in each of the Confederation's states, there was, from 1837 until the dissolution, a "provisional president" under Marshal Andrés de Santa Cruz, who was styled the "supreme protector" and was also president of Bolivia.

- Bolivia

- President: General José Miguel de Velasco

- North Peru (also known as Republic of the North of Peru, or North-Peruvian Republic)

- First President: General Luis Orbegoso (21 August 1837 – 30 July 1838) (Note: He declared secession of the North-Peruvian Republic from the Peru-Bolivian Confederation on 30 July 1838, but continued as Provisional President until 1 September 1838.)
- Second President: General José de la Riva Agüero (1 August 1838 – 24 January 1839)

- South Peru (also known as Republic of the South of Peru, or South-Peruvian Republic)

- First President: General Ramón Herrera y Rodado (17 September 1837 – 12 October 1838)
- Second President: Juan Pío de Tristán y Moscoso (12 October 1838 – 23 February 1839)

This was in accordance to the constitution's stating that each of the three republics would have its own government, with equal rights between the three, but they were subject to the authority of a General Government, whose three powers would have the following characteristics:

- The Central Executive Power would be in the hands of Santa Cruz with the title of Protector of the Confederation, with a term of 10 years and the possibility of being re-elected, although the latter was not applicable if he had been removed from office by the Senate. The general customs and the general postal administration depended on him, as well as all diplomatic, military and naval appointments. He was also Generalissimo of the sea and land forces of the confederate republics. He exercised the executive power of the state in which he was found. He appointed and removed the ministers of State and other public employees, being able to create new ministries. He chose the presidents of the confederate states, the senators of the General Congress and the ministers of the three supreme courts from among those proposed by their respective senates. He presented to the apostolic chair the archbishops and bishops of the three republics. He could dissolve the General Congress when a spirit of disorder manifestly seized the chambers, threatening the internal peace of the confederation.
- The General Legislative Power would be made up of two Chambers: one of Senators, with 15 members (five per State), and another of Representatives, with 21 members (7 per State). They met every two years for fifty days, and may be extended at the discretion of the Executive. He could be summoned extraordinarily by the government, having to deal exclusively with the matters imposed by it. All this made him a kind of caricature of legislative power.

- The senators had to be appointed by the Protector from among those proposed by the Electoral Colleges of each department. Their functions were similar to those of the censors mentioned in the Lifetime Constitution of 1826.
- The representatives had to be chosen by the General Congress of the confederation, from among those proposed by the Electoral Colleges of each of the confederate republics.

- The Judicial Power would be constituted on the basis of the Supreme Courts of the three Confederate Republics.

In addition to the above, the constitution also defined the flag of the confederation.

=== Administrative divisions ===
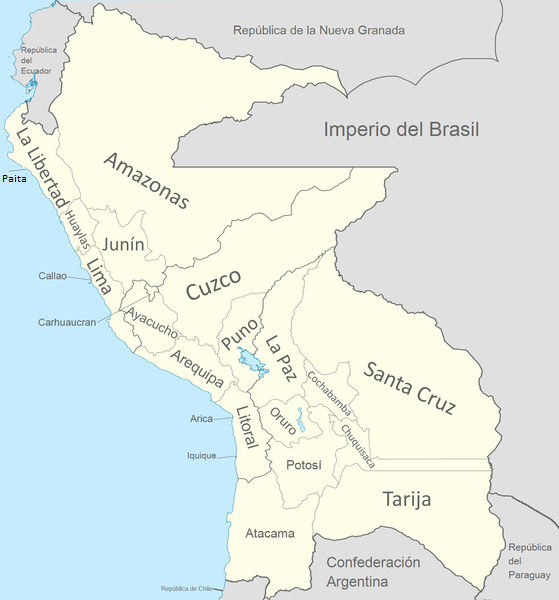
De jure map of the Confederation

North Peru
1. Amazonas
2. Callao
3. Huaylas
4. Lima
5. Junín
6. La Libertad
South Peru
1. Arequipa
2. Ayacucho
3. Cuzco
4. Litoral
5. Puno
Bolivia
1. Atacama
2. Cochabamba
3. Chuquisaca
4. La Paz
5. Oruro
6. Potosí
7. Santa Cruz
8. Tarija
Special administration
1. Arica
2. Carhuaucran

=== Foreign relations ===
- Argentina: after Bolivia occupied and annexed the disputed territory of Tarija, Argentina declared war on the Confederation on 19 May 1837. After the war ended, Argentina negotiated with the new Bolivian state over the territories, and Tarija ultimately remained in Bolivia.
- Brazil: Brazilian diplomat Duarte da Ponte Ribeiro was appointed as the Brazilian chargé d'affaires to Peru in 1829, and continued his functions after the establishment of the Confederation in 1836. After the state's dissolution, he remained as the representative to Peru, signing a border treaty in 1841.
- Central America: Morazán and Andrés de Santa Cruz never met, due to political circumstances.
- Chile: relations soured quickly after the establishment of the Confederation as Chile wanted to maintain its hegemony over trade in the South Pacific. Peruvian support for a failed naval invasion led to the declaration of war in 1836, which led to a Chilean-backed naval invasion in South Peru, through which relations were reestablished via the 1837 Treaty of Paucarpata.
- Ecuador: Vicente Rocafuerte, then president of Ecuador, presented a neutral position despite repeated attempts by Chile to get Ecuador to join the conflict, offering instead to act as a mediator. Despite this, according to J.P. Roldán, then Consul in Guayaquil, supporters of Juan José Flores were eager to join Chile in its war effort. Santa Cruz's government favoured Ecuador by sending subversive leaders José María Urvina and Juan Otamendi to Jauja, as well as interning subversive Ecuadorians to the Sierra. Ecuador had signed a treaty with the three member states of the Confederation, which was annulled by the Ecuadorian Congress in 1837 under Flores' influence. When the Confederation ceased to exist, its consulate in Guayaquil was transferred to the new Peruvian government.
- France: The French King Louis Philippe I has cordial relations with Andrés de Santa Cruz. The French government has given Andrés de Santa Cruz asylum after his exile after the dissolution of the confederation.
- Great Britain: The British government acted as guarantor of the Treaty of Paucarpata of 1837. When the treaty was annulled, the Consul General notified the Chilean government of Queen Victoria's disapproval of the continuation of the war. Then chargé d'affaires Belford Hinton Wilson made demands to guarantee the safety of British goods in Lima, which were later moved to Callao.
- Mexico: The Government of José Justo Corro has diplomatic relations with both Peru and Bolivia.
- New Granada: When pressed by Chilean minister Ventura Lavalle to join the conflict, then president Francisco de Paula Santander expressed his belief that, despite him agreeing with Chile over the threat the state posed to the region (and his personal disliking of Santa Cruz's government and person), the state was doomed due to its dysfunctionality between Santa Cruz's government and Peruvian elements in Bolivia, and recommended that he accept the Ecuadorian mediation so that the war could end.
- Paraguay: the government of José Gaspar Rodríguez de Francia did not have establish relations with Andrés de Santa Cruz due to political circumstances.
- Spain: Spain did not have diplomatic relations with the confederation, because it had not recognized either Peru or Bolivia, largely due to the skirmishes caused by the wars of independence.
- United States: The Confederation was recognized by the U.S. on 16 March 1837, and James B. Thornton was appointed as chargé d'affaires to the new state. After the country's dissolution in 1839, the U.S. did not recognize Bolivia as a separate state until 1848.
- Uruguay: Manuel Oribe and Andrés de Santa Cruz never met due to political circumstances.

== Legacy ==
In 2011, President Ollanta Humala of Peru proposed Bolivian president Evo Morales to reunite the countries in a confederation. The Cabinets of the two countries have held joint meetings.

== See also ==
- War of the Confederation
- Gran Colombia – Bolívar's Federation
- Federal Republic of Central America – another federal state on the American continent that underwent a similar fate.

== Bibliography ==
- Altuve-Febres Lores, Fernán (1996). Los Reinos del Perú: apuntes sobre la monarquía peruana.
- Basadre Grohmann, Jorge (2014). Historia de la República del Perú [1822-1933]. Vol. 2. El Comercio. ISBN 978-612-306-353-5.
- Husson, Patrick (1992). De la guerra a la rebelión: (Huanta, siglo XIX). Centro de Estudios Regionales Andinos "Bartolomé de Las Casas" & Instituto Francés de Estudios Andinos.
- Méndez Gastelumendi, Cecilia (2002). "El poder del nombre, o la construcción de identidades étnicas y nacionales en el Perú: Mito e historia de los iquichanos". Documento de Trabajo. Instituto de Estudios Peruanos (IEP). ISSN 1022-0356.
- Méndez Gastelumendi, Cecilia (2005a). The Plebeian Republic: The Huanta Rebellion and the Making of the Peruvian State, 1820–1850. Duke University Press. ISBN 978-0822334415.
- Parkerson, Phillip T. (2009). Andrés de Santa cruz y la Confederación Perú-Boliviana, 1835-1839. Biblioteca del Bicentenario de Bolivia.
- Tamayo Herrera, José (1985). Nuevo Compendio de Historia del Perú. Editorial Lumen.
