= José Tamayo Herrera =

Peruvian historian

Regidor of Cuzco Province
- In office January 1, 1967 – December 31, 1969

Personal details
- Born: December 5, 1936 (age 87) Cuzco, Peru

José Armando Tamayo Herrera (born in Cuzco on December 5, 1936) is a Peruvian historian, writer and university professor. In the field of historical research, he has developed regional history, ideas and art, applying innovative methods and analysis. He has twice been director of the National Library of Peru.

== Biography ==
Son of the senator and landowner Francisco Tamayo Pacheco and Estela Herrera Arteta. He completed his school studies at La Salle School in his hometown. In 1955 he entered the National University of Saint Anthony the Abbot in Cuzco, where he received his law degree and graduated as a doctor of letters (1964).

He pursued graduate courses at the National Autonomous University of Mexico (1960) and at Indiana University Bloomington (1961). Returning to his hometown, he was elected president of the University Federation of Cuzco (1961–1962).

In 1964, he began university teaching at his alma mater, as professor of History of Philosophical Ideas (1964–1973) and director of the Academic Program of Letters and Human Sciences (1969–1970).

Installed in Lima, he served as a professor at the Inca Garcilaso de la Vega University (1972, 1977–1980) and at the University of Lima, where he was director of the School of History (1992–1994).

He has been director of the National Library of Peru on two occasions (1981–1983, 1990–1991). He is also an active member of the Geographic Society of Lima, since 1978. He was incorporated into the National Academy of History in 2010.
