= Tapacarí =

Tapacarí San Agustín de Tapacarí Villa de Tapacarí
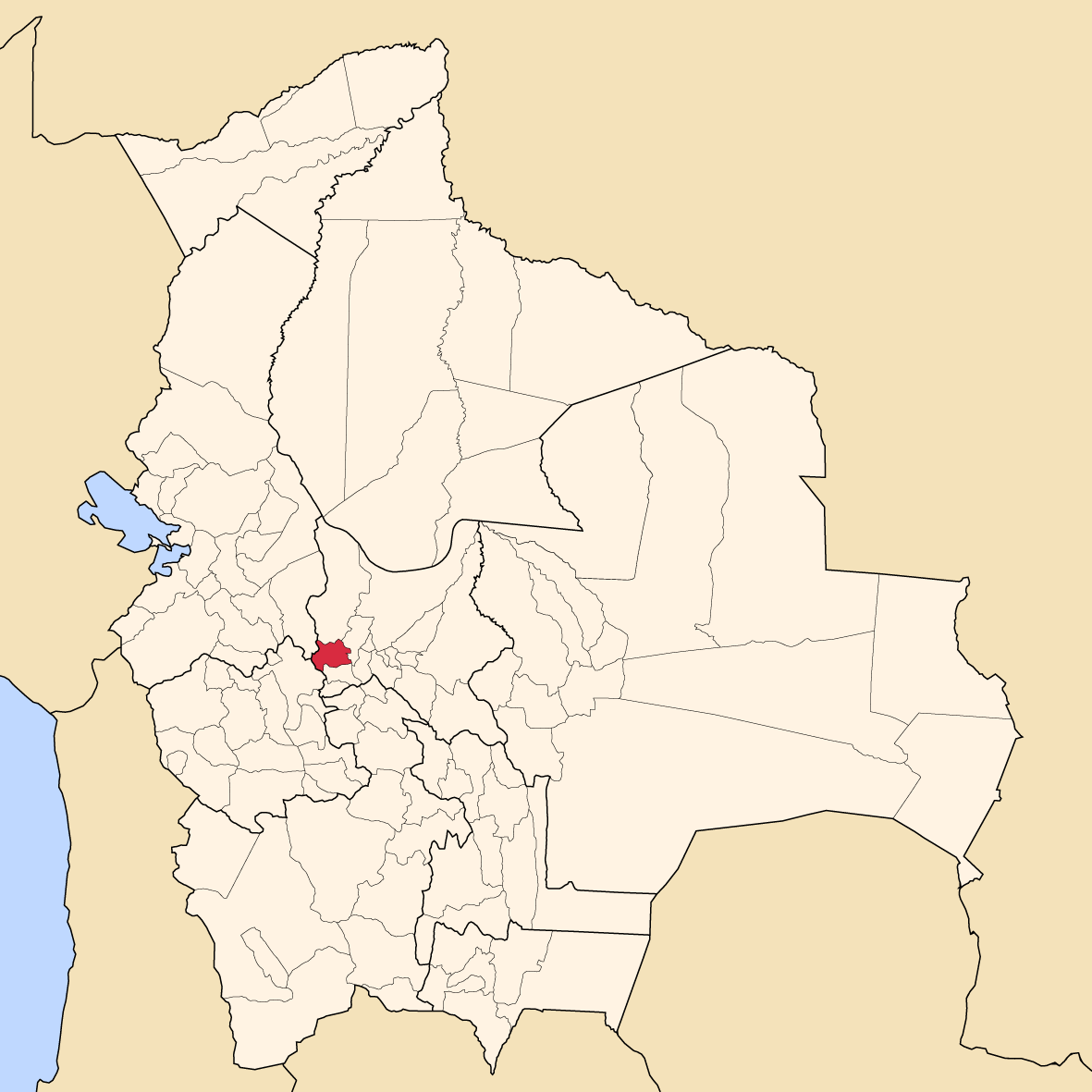
- Map of Bolivia showing Tapacarí province

- Location within Bolivia
- Coordinates: 17°30′53″S 66°37′15″W
- Country: Bolivia
- Department: Cochabamba Department
- Province: Tapacarí Province
- Municipality: Tapacarí Municipality
- Canton: Tapacarí Canton

Government
  - Mayor: Pedro Gutierrez Cruz (2007)
- Elevation: 9,833 ft (2,997 m)

Population (2001)
  - Total: 411
- Time zone: UTC-4 (BOT)

Tapacarí, Thapa Qhari is a town and the capital of Tapacarí Province in Cochabamba Department, Bolivia. It is located at an elevation of 2,997 m. At the time of census 2001 it had a population of 411. Most of the population lives either in adjacent rural areas or in the city of Cochabamba and they only occupy local dwellings during carnival or other festivals, or on business trips.

Important days include Independence Day on 6 August; the feast day of Saint Augustine on 28 August, and the large fiesta of the Virgen de Dolores (Our Lady of Sorrows) the third weekend of September. There is a food and textile fair in early September that brings in the rural population as well as city folk.

== History ==
The name Tapacarí comes from the Aymara words Thapa Qhari, "nest of men", or settlement.

The town was founded on 23 January 1826, by Antonio José de Sucre.

In June 1836 the Congress of Tapacarí was held in the town to address the issue of giving president Andrés de Santa Cruz the power to establish the Peru–Bolivian Confederation. The congress met for ten days under the chairmanship of vice-president Mariano Enrique Calvo Cuellar. The congress granted the requested powers and granted other beneficences.
