= Bolivian Republic (Peru-Bolivian Confederation) =

Constituent republic of the Peru-Bolivian Confederation (1836-1839)

Bolivian Republic República Boliviana
- 1836–1839
- Flag Coat of arms
- Motto: Firme por la Unión
- Bolivia within the Peru–Bolivian Confederation
- Capital: Sucre
- Government: Republic
- President
  - 1836–1839: Andrés de Santa Cruz
- History
  - Established: 21 June 1836
  - Disestablished: 25 August 1839
- ISO 3166 code: BO
Preceded by	Succeeded by
Bolivia	Bolivia
- Today part of: Bolivia; Chile; Argentina; Paraguay

The Bolivian Republic was one of the three constituent Republics of the short-lived Peru–Bolivian Confederation of 1836–1839.

The Confederation came to an end three years later after being defeated by Chile in the War of the Confederation. In August 1839, Agustín Gamarra declared the Confederation dissolved.

== Background ==
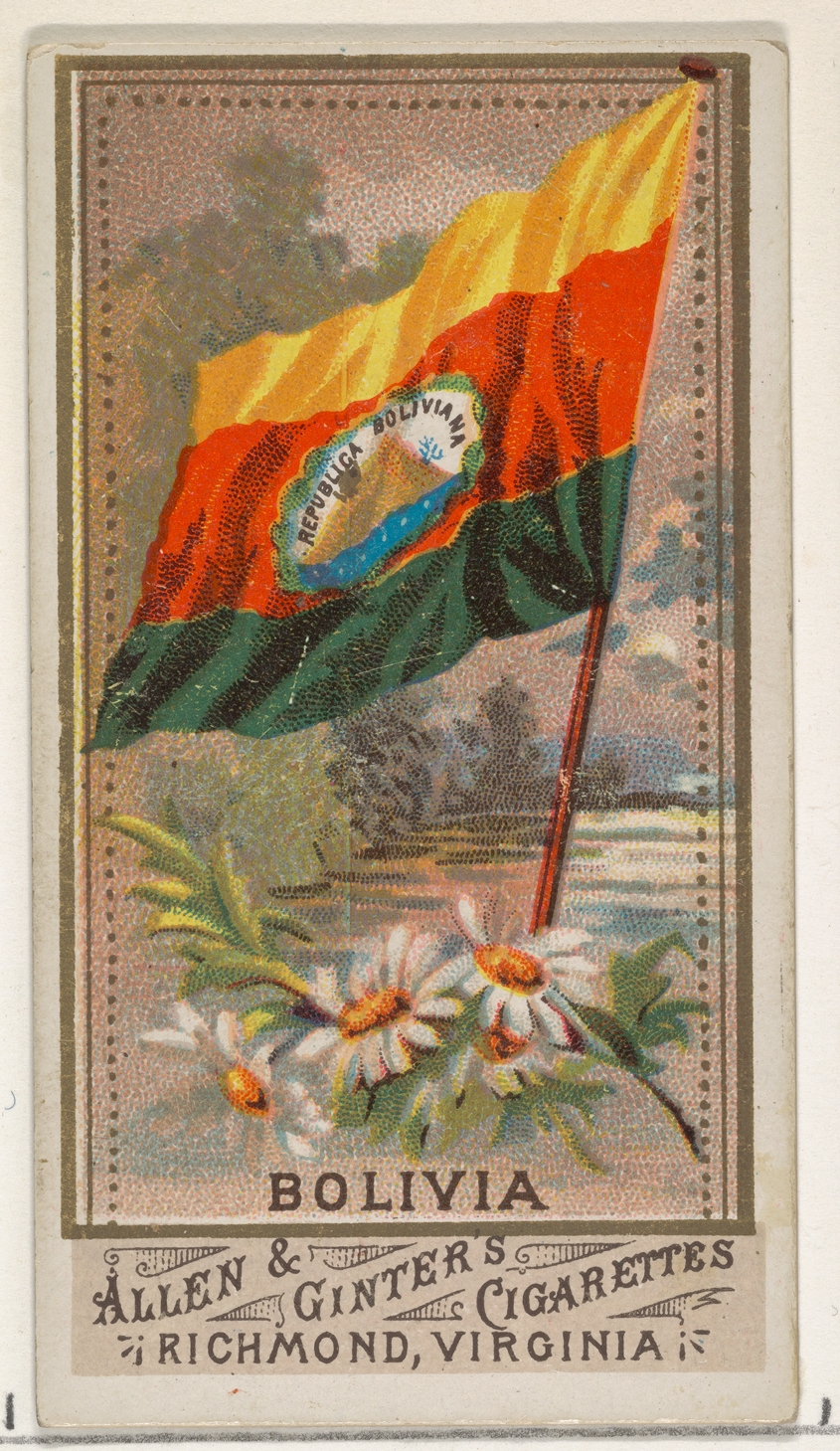
Bolivia, Flags of All Nations, Series 1 (N9) for Allen & Ginter (1837) depicting the flag and emblem of the Bolivian Republic

The Peru-Bolivian Confederation was a plan that attempted to reunite Upper Peru (now Bolivia) and Lower Peru (now simply Peru) into a single political and economic entity. Marshal Andrés de Santa Cruz promoted an ambitious project to reunite these two territories on the basis of a confederacy. This integration was based not only on historical, cultural and ethnic reasons but also on sound economic motives. The union was trying to restore the ancient commercial routes and promote a policy of open markets.

As President of Bolivia, Santa Cruz instigated several failed plots to achieve a political union with Peru, taking advantage of that country's chronic political unrest. His best opportunity came in 1835 when the Peruvian President General Luis José de Orbegoso requested his assistance to fight the rebel armies of Generals Agustín Gamarra and Felipe Santiago Salaverry. Santa Cruz defeated Gamarra at the Battle of Yanacocha on 13 August 1835 and Salaverry at the Battle of Socabaya on 7 February 1836.

With Bolivian help, General Orbegoso quickly regained his leadership throughout the country and had Salaverry summarily executed. In return for the support he received from Santa Cruz, he acceded to the formation of the new Peru–Bolivian Confederation. Santa Cruz assumed the Supreme Protectorship of the confederation and Orbegoso maintained only the presidency of the newly created Republic of North Peru.

== Administrative Divisions ==

The Bolivian Republic was divided into 7 departments:

1. Cochabamba Department
2. Chuquisaca Department
3. La Paz Department
4. Oruro Department
5. Potosí Department
6. Santa Cruz Department
7. Tarija Department
