= Andrés de Santa Cruz =

Supreme Protector of the Peru-Bolivia Confederation

Marshal Andrés de Santa Cruz
- Portrait by Manuel Ugalde, c. 1835

Supreme Protector of the Peru–Bolivian Confederation (Note: Proclaimed "Supreme Protector" of South Peru in 17 March and North Peru in 6 August. Formally proclaimed "Protector of the Confederation" by the Congress of Tacna on 1 May 1837.)
- In office 28 October 1836 – 20 February 1839 (Note: Santa Cruz resigned on 20 February 1839, although in fact his government had been overthrown on the 17th. Most sources place the date of his official resignation as the end of his term.)
- Preceded by: Himself (as supreme commander of the United Army)
- Succeeded by: José Miguel de Velasco (as president of Bolivia); Agustín Gamarra (as president of Peru); Antonio Huachaca (as supreme chief of Iquicha)

6th President of Bolivia
- In office 24 May 1829 – 20 February 1839; Provisional: 24 May 1829 – 15 August 1831
- Vice President: José Miguel de Velasco (1829–1835); Mariano Enrique Calvo (1835–1839)
- Preceded by: José Miguel de Velasco (acting)
- Succeeded by: José Miguel de Velasco (provisional)

Interim President of Peru
- In office 28 January 1827 – 9 June 1827
- Preceded by: Simón Bolívar
- Succeeded by: Agustín Gamarra

President of the Peruvian Council of Government
- In office 30 November 1826 – 9 June 1827; Acting: 29 June 1826 – 30 November 1826
- President: Simón Bolívar (Note: Until 27 January 1827.)
- Preceded by: Hipólito Unanue
- Succeeded by: Manuel Salazar y Baquíjano (as vice president)

Supreme commander of the United Army
- In office 8 July 1835 – 28 October 1836
- Preceded by: Luis Orbegoso (as president of Peru)
- Succeeded by: Himself (as supreme protector of the Peru–Bolivian Confederation)

Personal details
- Born: 5 December 1792 Huarina, Upper Peru, Viceroyalty of the Río de la Plata
- Died: 25 September 1865 (aged 72) Beauvoir, France
- Spouse: Francisca Cernadas

Andrés de Santa Cruz y Calahumana (Spanish pronunciation: [anˈdɾes ðe ˈsanta ˈkɾus]; 30 November 1792 – 25 September 1865) was a Peruvian-Bolivian general and politician who served as interim president of Peru in 1827, the interim president of Peru from 1836 to 1838 and the sixth president of Bolivia from 1829 to 1839. He also served as Supreme Protector of the short-lived Peru-Bolivian Confederation from 1836 to 1839, a political entity created mainly by his personal endeavors.

== Early life and education ==
Santa Cruz was born on 30 November 1792, in the town of Huarina, La Paz. He was the son of a colonial noble family, born of Field Master José de Santa Cruz y Villavicencio, a member of the Order of Santiago, originally from Huamanga (now Ayacucho, Peru), and Juana Basilia Calahumana, heiress to the curacazgo of the town of Huarina (Bolivia), near Lake Titicaca, and of Aymara descent. In later years, Andrés de Santa Cruz would claim that through his mother, he descended directly from Inca rulers. He began his studies in his hometown at the San Francisco Convent, and continued them at the San Antonio Abad Seminary in the city of Cuzco. In 1809 he left the seminary and returned to La Paz.

== Military career ==
After Santa Cruz's return home, his father enrolled him as an alférez in the Dragones de Apolobamba Regiment of the Spanish Army. As such, he participated in the battles of Guaqui (20 July 1811), Vilcapugio (1 October 1813) and Ayohuma (14 November 1813). The latter resulted in the defeat of the Argentine Independentist forces attempting to liberate the Upper Peru (modern day Bolivia) from Spanish rule. Santa Cruz also took part in the Spanish colonial campaigns to suppress the insurrection of Mateo Pumacahua (1814–15), further demonstrating his loyalty to the Spanish Crown. His luck ran out at the Battle of La Tablada (15 April 1817), where he was captured and taken as prisoner of war to Buenos Aires. He managed to escape, first to Rio de Janeiro and then to Lima. As a reward, he was named Commander of Chorrillos.

== War of Independence ==
At the time of the landing of the rebel army of José de San Martín on the Peruvian coast, Santa Cruz was commander of militia forces in the region of Huarochirí. In that position, he fought against the independentist in the Battle of Pasco (6 December 1820), but the royalists were defeated and Santa Cruz captured. Taken to San Martin's headquarters at Huaura, he decided to switch sides and joined the Patriot Army (8 January 1821). Santa Cruz ascended rapidly, reaching the rank of Colonel later that year and that of Brigade General in 1822 for leading Peruvian troops at the Battle of Pichincha (24 May 1822).

He revolted against the Peruvian Congress on 26 February 1823, and forced it to elect José de la Riva Agüero as President. As commander of a Peruvian Army expedition, Santa Cruz occupied the port of Arica and defeated a royalist army at the Battle of Zepita (27 August 1823). Failing to exploit his victory, he retreated hastily.

When Simón Bolívar assumed the presidency of Peru (17 February 1824), Santa Cruz joined his army and was named Chief of Staff of the Peruvian Division. In that condition, he participated of the Battle of Junín (6 August 1824). Afterwards, he was named Prefect of Ayacucho, and then Chief of Staff of the Patriot Army during the campaign for the liberation of Bolivia. As a reward for his actions, Santa Cruz received the titles of Marshal and Prefect of Chuquisaca in April 1825. In the first months of 1826, he was Prefect of La Paz. He left that position in September of that same year to General Gregorio Fernández.

Named President of the Government Council in Lima, he was in charge of the Peruvian Executive after Bolívar returned to Gran Colombia on 4 September 1826, until the collapse of the Bolivarian regime in Peru on January 27, 1827. Santa Cruz temporarily assumed the post of President until 9 June 1827, when José La Mar was elected by Congress.

== President of Bolivia ==
Removed from power, Santa Cruz was named Peruvian ambassador to Chile, but he was recalled to Bolivia where he had been proclaimed as President. Sworn in on 24 May 1829, he found a country afflicted by endemic internal disorders and very near to bankruptcy. Measures undertaken to resolve these problems included purging conspirators, reforming and strengthening the Army, reforming the bureaucracy, reforming public finances, issuing new currency, issuing a new Constitution, issuing a new Civil Code based on the Napoleonic Code and establishing Cobija as a free port. The authoritarian regime imposed by Santa Cruz brought stability to Bolivia at a time when most countries in Latin America faced widespread unrest. Furthermore, it formed a solid base from which to pursue his main project, the Peru-Bolivian Confederation.

== Peru-Bolivian Confederation ==
Flag of the Peru-Bolivian Confederation

As President of Bolivia, Santa Cruz instigated several failed plots to achieve a political union with Peru, taking advantage of that country's chronic political unrest. His best opportunity came in 1835 when the Peruvian President Luis José de Orbegoso requested his assistance to fight the rebel army of Felipe Santiago Salaverry. Santa Cruz defeated Peruvian caudillo Agustín Gamarra at the Battle of Yanacocha (13 August 1835) and Salaverry at the Battle of Uchumayo (4 February 1836) after which he had Salaverry summarily executed.

At the instigation of Santa Cruz, a Congress of the Peruvian southern departments (Arequipa, Ayacucho, Cuzco and Puno) gathered at Sicuani and declared the establishment of the Republic of South Peru (17 March 1836). A similar assembly at Huaura of the northern departments (Amazonas, Junín, La Libertad and Lima) founded the Republic of North Peru (11 August 1836). Both recognized Santa Cruz as Supreme Protector with extensive powers, which enabled him to create the Peru-Bolivian Confederation on 28 October 1836. He summoned to the city of Tacna representatives of both legislatures together with those of the Bolivian Congress assembled at Tapacarí to establish a Constitution for the new State. Under his direction, they signed a pact on 1 May 1837, which named him Supreme Protector for a ten-year period.

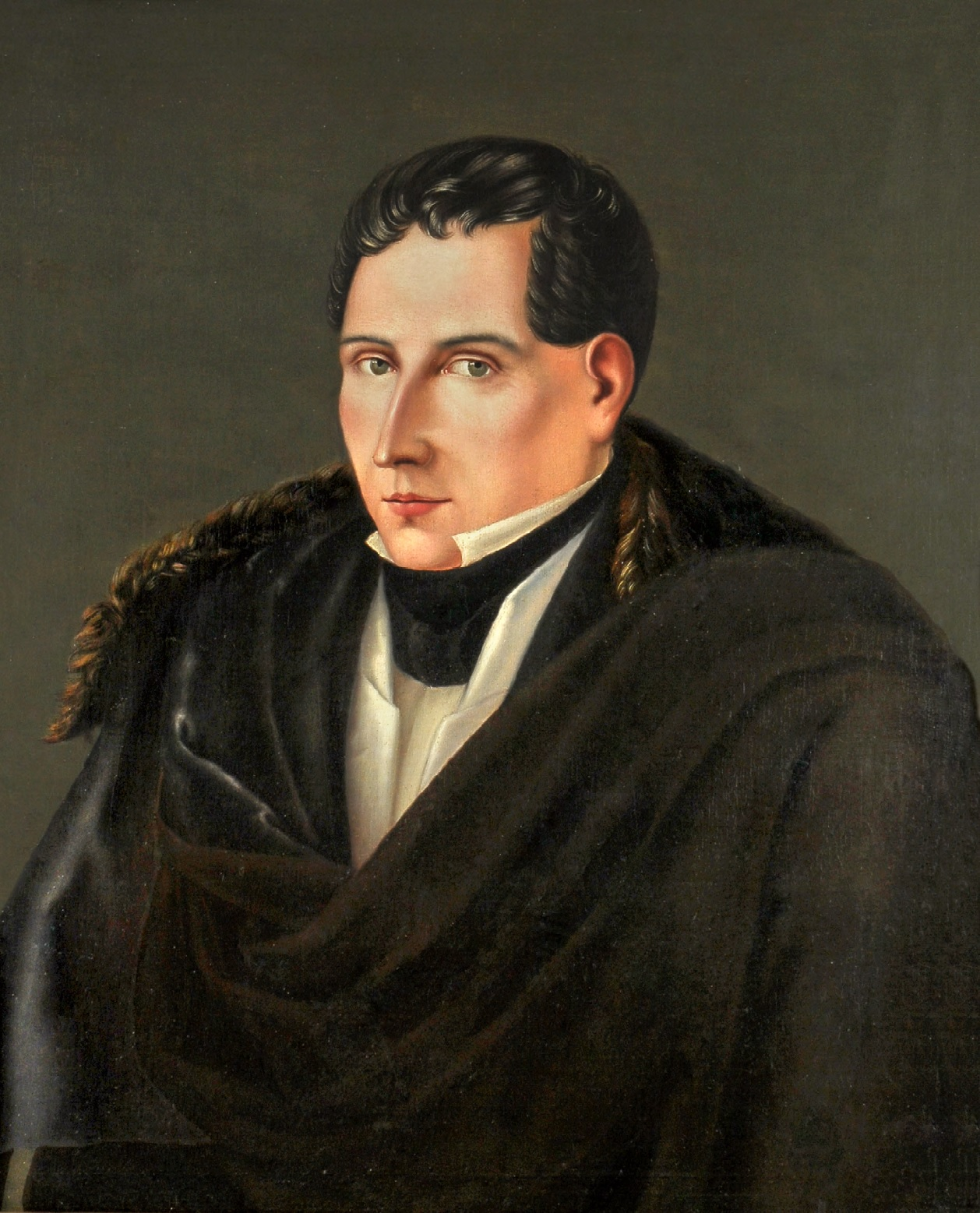
Diego Portales

Invested with considerable powers, Santa Cruz endeavoured to establish in Peru the same type of authoritarian order he had imposed in Bolivia. He issued a Civil Code, a Penal Code, a Trade Regulation, a Customs Regulation and reorganized tax collection procedures allowing an increase in state revenues while restraining expenditures. The Confederation generated resistances among several groups in both countries, who resented the dilution of national identities. An important number of Peruvian politicians opposed to the idea of the Confederation fled to Chile, where they received support from the powerful Minister Diego Portales. Together they amassed a military expedition against Santa Cruz, led by Admiral Manuel Blanco Encalada, but they were encircled by Santa Cruz and had to surrender by the Treaty of Paucarpata, signed on 17 November 1837. The Chilean Government organized a second expedition, which defeated the Supreme Protector at the Battle of Yungay (20 January 1839) and forced the dissolution of the Confederation.

During his tenure he advocated for the protectionist economic policies. Andrés de Santa Cruz was a staunch supporter of protectionist mercantilism rather than a liberal.

== Later years ==
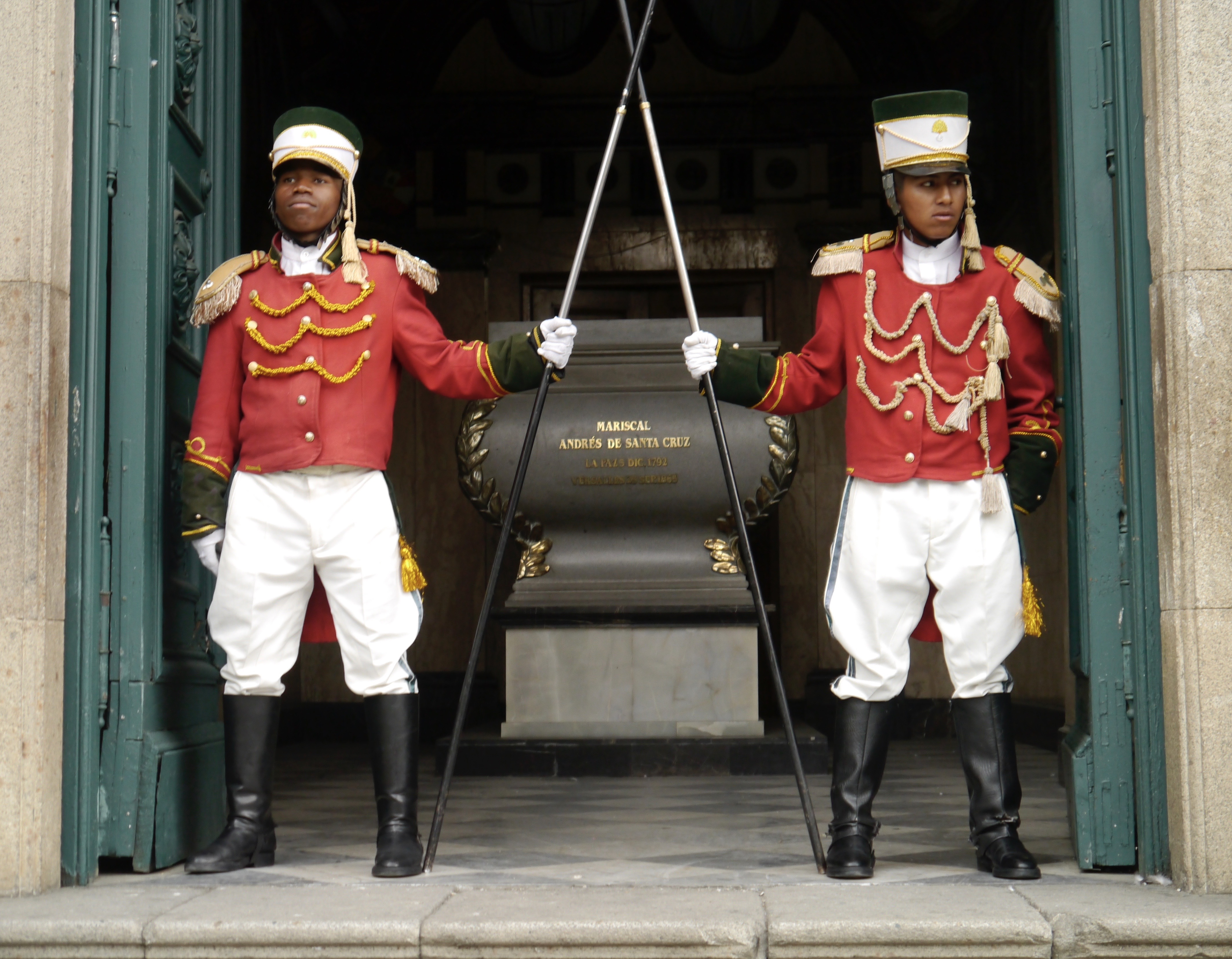
Members of the Colorados Regiment guard the tomb of Andrés de Santa Cruz in Cathedral Basilica of Our Lady of Peace, La Paz

After resigning from his post as Supreme Protector (20 February 1839), Santa Cruz fled to Ecuador from where he plotted unsuccessfully to regain power. On 13 October 1843, he disembarked at Camarones in the Peruvian province of Tarapacá but was captured while trying to reach Bolivia. Delivered to the Chilean Government, he was imprisoned at Chillán from 1844 until 1846 when he was freed. He was named ambassador to several European countries by Manuel Belzú (1848–55) and then ran for president of Bolivia but was defeated by General Jorge Córdova. After staying for a while in Argentina, he returned to France where he lived the rest of his life at Versailles. He died at Beauvoir, near Nantes on 25 September 1865. he was buried at Cemetery of Notre-Dame, Versailles. One hundred years later, in 1965, his remains were repatriated from France by the military government of the day and reinterred ceremoniously at Cathedral Basilica of Our Lady of Peace, La Paz beside the Presidential Palace.

== See also ==
- History of Bolivia
- History of Peru
- Peru-Bolivian Confederation
- War of the Confederation

== Citations ==
Political offices
Preceded by Hipólito Unanue	President of the Council of Government; 1826–1827	Succeeded by Manuel Salazar y Baquíjano; Acting
Preceded by Simón Bolívar	President of Peru; Acting; 1827	Succeeded by Manuel Salazar y Baquíjano; Acting
Preceded by José Miguel de Velasco; Acting	President of Bolivia; 1829–1839	Succeeded by José Miguel de Velasco; Provisional
Preceded by Office established	Supreme Protector of the Peru–Bolivian Confederation; 1836–1839	Succeeded by Office abolished
