= List of wars involving Bolivia =

This is a list of wars involving the Plurinational State of Bolivia and its predecessor states from 1809 to the present.

- Battle of Huarina (1547): Spanish conquest of the Inca Empire

Conflict	Combatant 1	Combatant 2	Results
Spanish American wars of independence (1808–1833)	Patriots; Supported by: United Kingdom (1815–1819); United States (1810–1819); Haiti; Indigenous allies	Royalists; Spain; Supported by: Russian Empire; Indigenous allies	Patriot victory: Disintegration of Spanish America; Diplomatic recognition in 1821 (Portugal), 1822 (US), and 1825 (UK).; Spain retained the islands of Cuba and Puerto Rico until the Spanish–American War of 1898.; Banda Oriental and Spanish Texas become part of the United Kingdom of Portugal, Brazil and the Algarves and First Mexican Empire respectively.
Bolivian War of Independence (1809–1825)	Patriots: Bolivia; Republiquetas; Gran Colombia; Peru; (Argentina) United Provinces	Royalists: Spain; Viceroyalty of Peru	Patriot victory: Independence of Bolivia
Invasion of Chiquitos (1825)	Bolivia; Gran Colombia; Supported by: United Provinces	Empire of Brazil: Mato Grosso	Defeat: Brazilian troops temporarily occupy the region of Chiquitos and Moxos.; Simón Bolívar pledged not to support the Argentines on the issue of Cisplatina.
Bolivian–Peruvian territorial dispute (1825–1909)	Bolivia	Peru	Inconclusive: Polo–Bustamante Treaty is signed in 1909
Peruvian intervention of Bolivia (1828)	Bolivia; Gran Colombia: British legion	Peru: Upper Peru	Peruvian victory: Establishment of the Second Republic of Upper Peru.; End of Gran Colombian influence in Bolivia.; Start the Gran Colombian-Peruvian War.; More of 65% of Bolivia occupied by the Peruvian Army
Salaverry-Santa Cruz War (1835–1836)	Pro-Confederation: (Liberals); Orbegosistas; Crucistas Supported by: France; Republic of Iquicha (Chile) Pipiolos	Anti-Confederation: (Conservatives); Salaverristas; Gamarristas Supported by: (Argentine Confederation) Argentina; Chile; Spain; Limeños and Arequipeños	Pro-Confederate victory: Execution of Felipe Santiago Salaverry; Creation of a confederate state; Start of the War of the Confederation
War of the Confederation (1836–1839)	Peru–Bolivian Confederation Orbegoso government (only in 1838)	United Restoration: Chile; Peruvian restorers; La Fuente government (1837); Gamarra government (1838–1839); Argentine Confederation (since 1837)	Chilean–Peruvian restorationist victory: Fall and dissolution of the Peruvian-Bolivian Confederation; Peruvian reunification and restoration of the republics of Peru and Bolivia; Exile of Andrés de Santa Cruz; Iquicha War of 1839; Through negotiations with Bolivia, Argentina recovers the territories of the provinces of Jujuy and Salta that were occupied during the war
War between Argentina and Peru–Bolivian Confederation (1837–1839)	Peru–Bolivian Confederation	Argentine Confederation	Inconclusive: Subsequent peace between the Argentine Confederation and Bolivia after the dissolution of the Peru–Bolivian Confederation; Through negotiations with Bolivia, Argentina recovers the territories of the provinces of Jujuy and Salta that were occupied during the war
Peruvian-Bolivian War of 1841-1842 (1841–1842)	Bolivia	Peru	Treaty of Puno: Peruvian invasion repelled by Bolivian troops; Bolivian invasion repelled by Peruvian troops; Status quo ante bellum
Pérez Rebellion (1862)	Bolivia	(Bolivia) General Gregorio Pérez's Rebels	Victory: Government victory
Constitutional Revolution of Sucre (1865–1866)	Bolivia	(Bolivia) Constitutional Rebels	Victory: Government victory
Chincha Islands War (1865–1871)	Chile; Peru (since 1866) Nominal participation: Ecuador (since 1866); Bolivia (since 1866)	Spain	Indecisive, both sides claimed victory: Indefinite armistice of 1871; Peace treaties between Spain and Peru (1879), Bolivia (1879), Chile (1883) and Ecuador (1885).
Bolivian Civil War of 1870 (1870–1871)	Bolivia	(Bolivia) Rebels	Victory: Government victory
War of the Pacific (1879–1883)	Bolivia; Peru	Chile	Chilean Forces victory: Bolivia becomes a landlocked country.; The Peruvian Civil War started a year later due to the Treaty of Ancon; Chilean influence increased until 1885, when Cáceres won the Peruvian civil war.; Litoral Department (Antofagasta) occupied by Chile since 1879, ceded by Bolivia to Chile in 1904.; Tarapacá Department occupied by Chile since 1879, ceded by Peru to Chile in 1884.; Puna de Atacama ceded by Bolivia to Chile and Argentina in 1889 and 1899.; Tacna Region occupied by Chile since 1880, returned to Peru in 1929.; Arica Province occupied by Chile since 1880, ceded to Chile in 1929.
Chiriguano War (1892)	Bolivia	Chiriguano	Victory: Subjugation of the Chiriguano people
Bolivian Civil War (1898–1899)	Conservatives	Liberals	Liberal victory: Creation of the Federal Government Junta; La Paz becomes de facto seat of government
Acre War (1899–1903)	(Bolivia) Bolivia; Supported by: United States	Republic of Acre; Supported by: Brazil	Brazilian victory: Treaty of Petrópolis (between Bolivia and Brazil); Valerde-Río Branco Treaty (between Brazil and Peru); Polo-Bustamante Treaty (between Peru and Bolivia); Brazilian annexation of Acre
Campaign of the Manuripi Region (1910)	Bolivia	Peru	Peruvian Forces victory: Withdrawal of the Bolivian Army.; Mandatory recognition by Bolivia of the Polo-Bustamente treaty given in 1909.; Peruvian Republic obtains 250,000 km² recognises by Bolivia in the treaty and cedes 400km² to Peru
Chaco War (1932–1935)	Bolivia	Paraguay	Paraguayan victory Most of the disputed area awarded to Paraguay
World War II (1943–1945)	Allies; United States; Soviet Union; United Kingdom; China; France; Poland; Canada; Australia; New Zealand; India; South Africa; Yugoslavia; Greece; Denmark; Norway; Netherlands; Belgium; Luxembourg; Czechoslovakia; Brazil; Mexico; Chile; Bolivia; Colombia; Ecuador; Paraguay; Peru; Venezuela; Uruguay; Argentina	Axis; Germany; Japan; Italy; Hungary; Romania; Bulgaria; Croatia; Slovakia; Finland; Thailand; Manchukuo; Mengjiang	Allied victory: Collapse of the German Reich; Fall of Japanese and Italian Empires; Creation of the United Nations; Emergence of the United States and the Soviet Union as superpowers; Beginning of the Cold War
Bolivian National Revolution of 1952 (1952)	Bolivian Government; Republican Socialist Unity Party	Revolutionary Nationalist Movement	Defeat: Resignation of President Mamerto Urriolagoitía; Replacement of the oligarchic; political order: The Revolutionary Nationalist Movement's recognition during elections.
Ñancahuazú Guerrilla (1966–1967)	Bolivia; United States	ELN; Cuba	Bolivian government victory: Che Guevara executed
Teoponte Guerrilla (1970)	Bolivia	ELN (Teoponte)	Bolivian government victory

== See also ==
- Bolivian War of Independence

== Notes ==
1. First invasion of the Banda Oriental by the Portuguese army led by Diogo de Sousa in 1811 to annex the territory, which during the colonial period was disputed between Spain and Portugal. Not to destroy the independent government of Buenos Aires. In 1816 he invaded the Banda Oriental again and conquered it after a military campaign that lasted until 1820.
2. Consolidation stage is a broad, diffuse, confusing and different period for each independent country. Various states were formed at the beginning of the war, went through different processes that changed them politically. This was due to reasons such as the overthrow of the government by the royalists and their subsequent restoration (for example, Chile and Venezuela), and also by the union of independent states that came to form a new political entity (Gran Colombia and the Mexican Empire).
3. Seven resulted non-recognized states emerged at the moment of the war of independence: Chile, Gran Colombia (Venezuela and New Granada), México, Paraguay, and Bolivia, with self-determination from the United Provinces of the Río de la Plata and Peru.
4. Mexico in its consolidation stage was organized as an empire from 1821 to 1823. When the empire was dissolved, Mexico was reorganized as a republic and the Central American territories that were part of the empire were reorganized into a new political entity called the United Provinces of Central America.
5. Spain's Royal Army also was in the Mexican side, because the royalist criollo Colonel Agustín de Iturbide that joined the pro-independence side.
6. During the course of the war, the United Provinces organized three land forces that fought on different fronts and periods: the army that confronted the royalists of Montevideo, the Army of the North and the Army of the Andes. In the maritime area, the government organized a naval force in 1811, which was destroyed in battle in that same year, so in 1813 it organized a second naval force that was operative until the decisive victory obtained in 1814. It then used corsairs in the sea until the end of the war.
7. In 1817, after the triumph of the independents in Chacabuco and the subsequent restoration of the Chilean government, the Chilean Army was again organized, which fought along with the Army of the Andes in the center-south zone of Chile. Later, both armies would form the Liberating Expedition of Peru, although a part of the Chilean force remained fighting in the country until its territorial consolidation. As for the maritime area, between 1817 and 1818 the Chilean Navy (First Chilean Navy Squadron) was founded and would operate until the end of the war. Between 1817 and 1820, Chile also used corsairs in the sea.
8. In its consolidation phase, the Mexican government had as a land force the so-called Army of the Three Guarantees, while to fight in the sea it founded the Mexican Navy.
9. Sailors and combatants recruited in United Kingdom. Sales of warships, weapons and ammunition.
10. guerrillas or violent rebellions in many countries
11. under flags of many belligerents
12. The First Texas Independence, 1813. The green flag is the first flag of Texas independence.
13. Republic of West Florida annexation (1810) and Rebellion of Republic of East Florida (1812).
14. Insurgent privateers using many flags.
15. diplomatic declaration exclusively.
