= Third siege of Callao =

Siege of the port of Callao during the War of the Confederation

- Part of the War of the Confederation
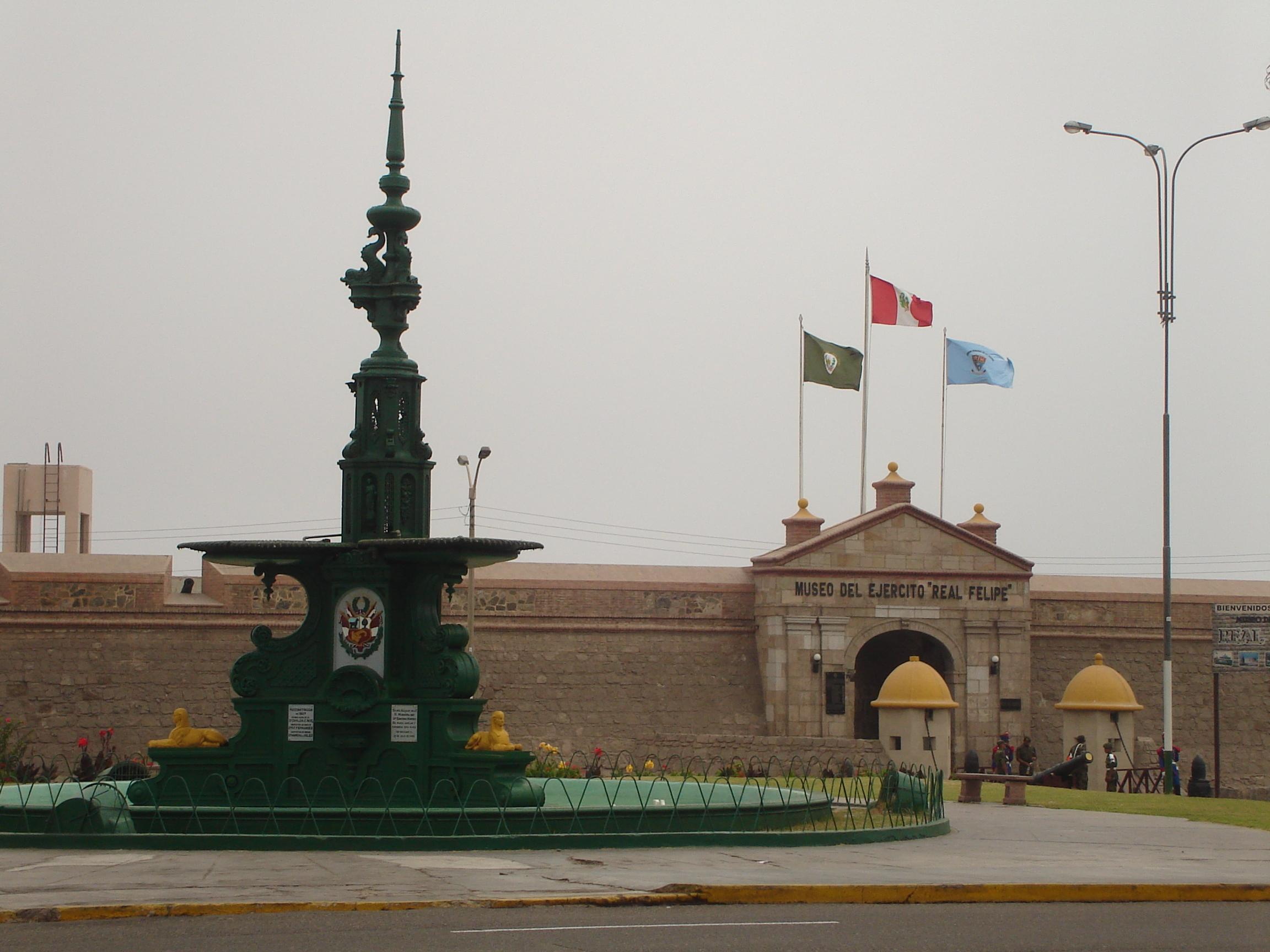
- Real Felipe Fortress
Date	31 August 1838 – 8 November 1838
Location	Callao, Peru (Note: The country was disputed between the secessionist Peruvian Republic (of the North) and the Peru–Bolivian Confederation. The former de facto ceased to exist after the Battle of Portada de Guías, but ceased to exist de jure after its integration into the confederation on October 20, 1938.) 12°02′00″S 77°08′00″W
Result	Confederate victory: Restorationists retreat to the north; Confederates capture Lima

Belligerents
United Restoration: Chile; Gamarra government	Peru–Bolivian Confederation

Commanders and leaders
José M. de la Cruz; C. G. del Postigo; Juan C. Torrico	Manuel de la Guarda

Strength
United Restoration Army: 1st division Chilean Navy: (Note: The first naval division under the command of Carlos García del Postigo Bulnes, formed by the corvettes "Libertad" and "Valparaíso", the brig "Aquiles", the schooner "Janequeo" and the brig "Arequipeño", continued to maintain the blockade of Callao.); 2 corvettes 1 schooner 2 brigs	1,200 soldiers 120 cannons 1 shallop Several boats and gunboats

Casualties and losses
Several due to illness	Several due to illness
- Location within Lima Third siege of Callao (Peru) Third siege of Callao (South America)

The third siege of Callao was a siege that took place in 1838 during the War of the Confederation between the United Restoration Army, supported by the Chilean army and the Peru–Bolivian Confederation. The confederates defeated the restorationist forces, who then retreated to Huacho due to the advance of the confederate army led by Andrés de Santa Cruz.

== Background ==
After the Battle of Portada de Guías and the occupation of Lima by the United Restoration Army under the command of General Manuel Bulnes, 700 men from the Ayacucho battalion led by General Domingo Nieto had retired to the Callao fortress, who joined the Real Felipe garrison, composed of by 500 soldiers under the command of Colonel Manuel de la Guarda. When Nieto arrived in Callao with his forces to resist the Restoration Army, his rank was not recognized by Colonel de la Guarda after an altercation that they had due to the attitude of the first in the Battle of Portada de Guías, so the solitary General Nieto abandoned the Callao by means of a foreign ship heading north to form his own army and fight the restorers, but his subtle forces that he managed to gather, including the Civic Battalion of Cajamarca, went entirely to the restorers. With no chance of participating, he went into self-imposed exile in Guayaquil for the rest of the war.

The colonel and now governor of the Plaza Manuel de la Guarda, together with his deputy Colonel Javier Panizo y Ramírez, with a force of 1,200 defenders and a good number of cannons from the Real Felipe Fortress would decide to resist the Restoration Army in Callao who, commanded by General José María de la Cruz and later by Colonel Juan Crisóstomo Torrico, would start a siege in the port from August 31 to November 8, 1838, being joined by the already established maritime blockade directed by the Admiral Carlos García del Postigo. It must be said that although the old Callao cannons had been sold to Spanish Carlist commissioners by the government of Felipe Santiago Salaverry, the fortress still had enough artillery to oppose a serious defense, which together with the limited power of the field cannons of the time that the Chilean army was carrying, it was enough to repel a direct assault by the Restoration Army.

General Luis José de Orbegoso, after the Portada de Guías disaster, was hidden for a few days in Lima where he later managed to reach Callao despite the siege with the aim of continuing to lead the efforts against those he considered his enemies, both the Restoration Army and the Confederates. His figure was reduced however to a semi-prisoner of the men who defended the port, with mere freedom to speak and write negatively against the Restoration Army and Santa Cruz. In reality, the garrison that was in Callao was defending the fortress because of its loyalty to the confederation and to Santa Cruz.

== Siege ==
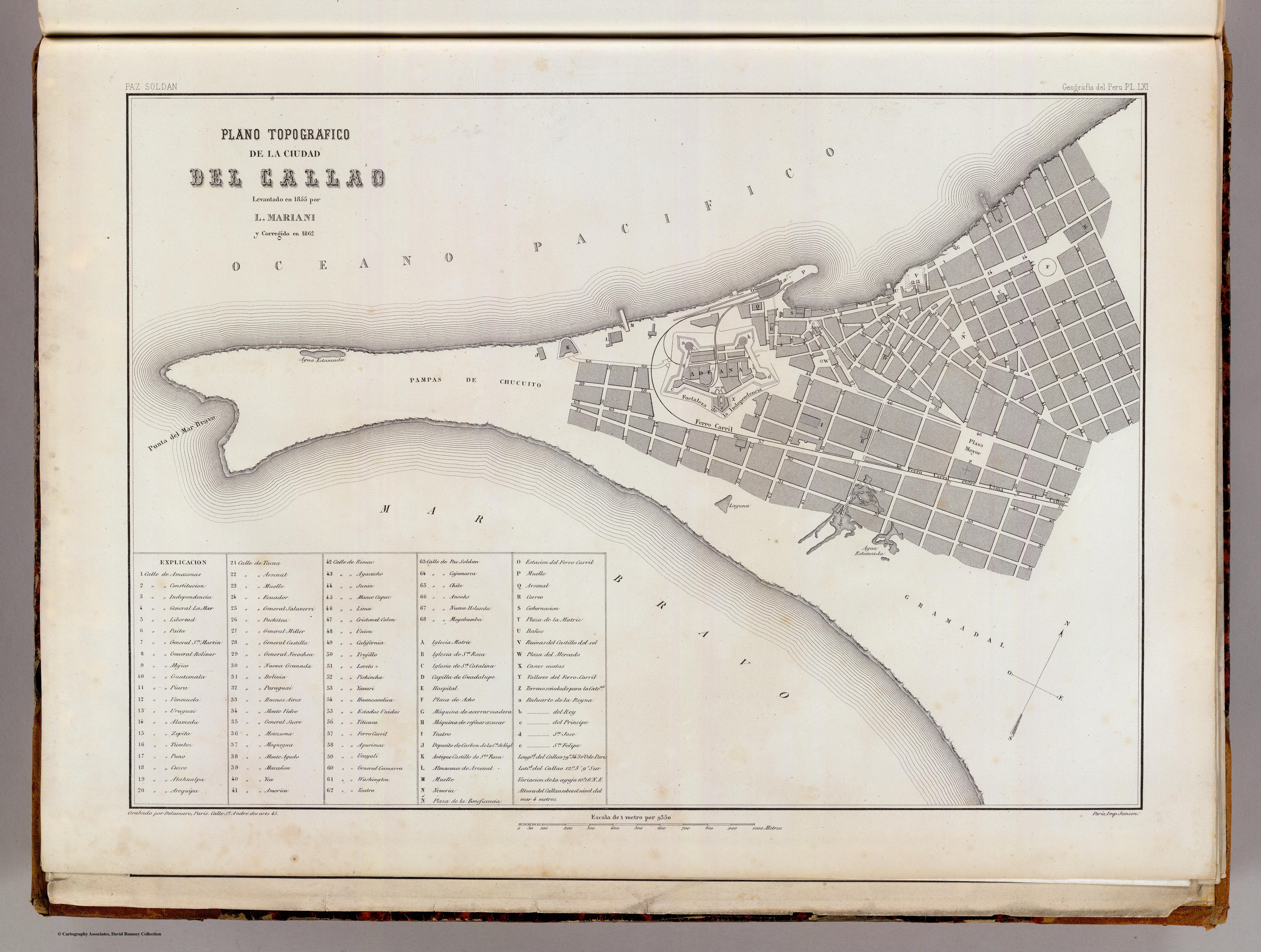
Topographic map of Callao, location of the siege.

The site of the square was limited to a medium-effective siege by land and sea since the restorers did not have the men and materials necessary to undertake an assault on the fortress where the Confederate troops were garrisoned. The objective of the besiegers was to exhaust and leave the defenders without provisions to achieve the capitulation of the square.

As the besieging army was camped in a marshy and unhealthy area, the casualties due to illness were numerous, which together with the constant departures of the garrison under the command of Colonel de la Guarda made an effective siege difficult.

The siege of Callao by the Chileans, of which we were witnesses, was not even in part as severe as that of the patriots. The squad was too weak and the army was small. From the sea, Chilean gunboats commanded by the English attacked Callao only at night; always after midnight we contemplated the moving spectacle of the numerous incandescent bullets crossing the darkness [...] The cavalry combats of the outposts and the exits of the besieged were small, the besiegers did not think of taking the Fortress by assault since for this they would have had to gather their entire army.

— Johann Jakob von Tschudi

On the other hand, Colonel de la Guarda, whom the Chilean historian Francisco Antonio Encina describes as energetic, was not content with harassing the besiegers by land and the garrison having been unable to fire their cannons on the Chilean ships due to a direct threat from those of the ships' willingness to open fire on them if their ships were damaged in the firefight. He did not waste any opportunity to attack them with whatever means were within his reach, von Tschudi himself refers to an episode he witnessed while on board the neutral merchant ship Edmond.

This categorical declaration had an effect and the garrison was compelled to withstand the attacks from the sea with helpless indignation. A few days after that incident, the Peruvians had the opportunity to take revenge. The Chilean admiral sent his assistant with seven sailors aboard our ship to buy shoes. The garrison of the fort observed this and armed a boat with 25 men which, covered by the other merchant ships, approached ours. The admiral's aide, informed of the danger, despite our advice to the contrary, jumped into the boat to flee. It was too late: at that moment, the enemy longboat appeared from behind the Edmond's bow and fired a full volley from just six paces away. Five sailors fell into the sea, dead or wounded; the other three taken prisoner, including the officer wounded by two bullets. We managed to save one of the sailors, throwing him a rope and covering him with the French flag. Unfortunately, the Peruvians had no squadron, since the Chileans had taken several warships from them for ignominious treason in time of peace [...]

— Johann Jakob von Tschudi

The actions at the site were varied, one of them occurred on September 18, when the Peruvian garrison of Callao, provided with enough weapons, bravely attacked the Restoration Army's outposts. The army's troops sustained the attack from 7 a.m., with more than 200 cannon shots being fired from the Real Felipe fortress. Three soldiers from the Portales battalion, one from the Carampangue battalion and three wounded from the Aconcagua battalion were lost. The losses of the besieged forces however, were greater.

On October 13, during the night, Second Lieutenant Manuel Antonio Marin was sent to guard the maritime advance, with a picket of 25 soldiers from the Valparaíso battalion. At dawn the next day, two companies of the besieged forces left their forts, escorting some carts loaded with vessels that were intended to supply the defenders. The restorers, observing this, deployed in guerrillas and broke fire on these companies, the fire being immediately answered by the large infantry and the great artillery pieces of the fortress. The small picket of soldiers from the Valparaíso battalion, despite being at a disadvantage and alternately enveloped by bullets, resisted and managed to force the besieged forces to retreat into their fortresses.

The siege was already dragging on for too long, and there were several casualties from the fighting and disease in the area. Adding to the pressure, the annoyances of foreign powers such as Great Britain, France and the United States that prevented an effective blockade and siege of the port. For reasons like these, General Cruz had already told Bulnes the impossibility of completely blocking the castles of the port, pointing out that "it would be better to use [their] forces in a more useful way." After failing all possible negotiations and the besieged not having the intention of capitulating, the Restoration Army lifted the siege, leaving Lima and heading for Huacho on November 15, before the advance of Andrés de Santa Cruz's army of 7000 seats and the intent of avoiding a battle at a tactical disadvantage.

== Consequences ==
After the retreat of the restorers under the command of Bulnes, the bulk of the Confederate army of Santa Cruz occupied Lima. Once in the capital, the protector awarded the defenders of Callao decorations and prizes, also ordering that they be awarded a medal with the inscription "Loyalty and Glory" which would have a castle engraved on which a red flag would fly as a symbol of the Confederation. However, after the defeat of Santa Cruz and the fall of the confederation, these provisions would be annulled as the Peruvian officers who supported him were discharged from the new Peruvian army. For his part, the Chilean historian Gonzalo Bulnes points out that "Although the picture of the deprivations of the besieging division, will not go down in history adorned with the brilliant colors of Buin or Yungay, the integrity with which they endured their sufferings and energy will be always worth remembering."

The withdrawal of the Confederates was a decision taken by General Bulnes and in accordance with his staff due to the fact that he found himself in a weak position to fight. The plan now was to advance north of Peru to the provinces that were loyal to him and force the Confederate army to go in pursuit and thus give a decisive battle in positions more favorable to it. Santa Cruz after a month would send detachments of his army to monitor and harass the restorers, then he would advance with the bulk of his army in pursuit of the restorers, reaching and confronting them mainly in Chiquián, Llaclla and Buin, achieving little definitive results. On January 20 of the following year, both armies clashed in Yungay, with the Restoration Army finally defeating the Confederates.

== See also ==
- War of the Confederation
- Luis José de Orbegoso
- Peruvian Republic (1838–1839)
