= Restoration Army of Peru =

Army of North Peru

- Ejército Restaurador del Perú
- Leaders: Agustín Gamarra; Felipe Santiago Salaverry (executed); Ramón Castilla; Manuel Ignacio de Vivanco; Antonio Gutiérrez de la Fuente; Juan Buendia
- Dates active: 1835–1839
- Merged into: United Restoration Army
- Wars: Salaverry-Santa Cruz War; War of the Confederation; Second Iquicha War

The Army of the North of Peru or Restoration Army of Peru was the army of the Northern Peruvian Republic that was made up of Peruvians opposed to the establishment of the Peru–Bolivian Confederation, who accused Bolivian President Andrés de Santa Cruz of having invaded and divided Peru with the support of Peruvian President Luis José de Orbegoso whom his opponents did not recognize as legitimate. It later merged with the Chilean Army to form the United Restoration Army. The goal of the army was to restore the united Peruvian state prior to the establishment of the Confederation.

The first person to use the name was General Felipe Santiago Salaverry during the war against Santa Cruz and Orbegoso. Upon his defeat and death, the command passed to Marshal Agustín Gamarra, with the title of Provisional President of the Peruvian Republic. (Note: This title was accepted by the restaurateurs, but not by the confederates who had Santa Cruz as Supreme Protector and their respective state presidents.)

== Members ==
Most of the officers were chiefs deported by supporters of Andrés de Santa Cruz such as Agustín Gamarra, Ramón Castilla, Manuel Ignacio de Vivanco, Felipe Pardo y Aliaga and Antonio Gutiérrez de la Fuente, along with separatist troops from Peru such as the Huaylas Battalion and the Hunters of Peru. Together with the Chilean Army and Navy, they formed the United Restoration Army, mentioned above. The organization of logistics supplies and medicines for the restorers was entrusted to La Fuente.

== Legacy ==
The defeat of the Peru-Bolivian Confederation occurred in the town of Villa de Yungay, in the Department of Huaylas on January 20, 1839. In commemoration of this victory, the Department of Huaylas took the name of the Department of Ancash, as it is known today.

Later the term was used again during the Peruvian revolutions where one of the parties called restoration to the cause they defended, such was the case of the revolution led by General Mariano Ignacio Prado in 1865.

== See also ==
- United Restoration Army
- War of the Confederation
- Peru–Bolivian Confederation
- North Peru
- South Peru
