= Battle of Portada de Guías =

1838 Chilean victory in the War of the Confederation

- Part of the War of the Confederation
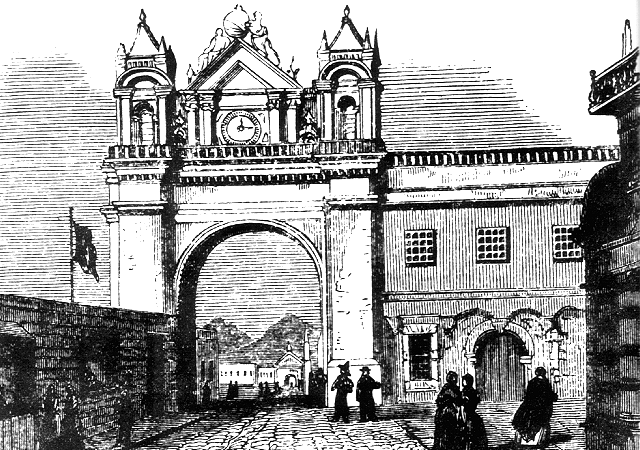
- 19th century painting of one of the old gates of Lima
Date	August 21, 1838
Location	Lima, Peruvian Republic 12°03′36″S 77°02′15″W
Result	Chilean victory

Belligerents
Chile	Orbegoso government (Note: On July 30, 1838, Orbegoso declared North Peru independent of "all foreign domination", i.e. the Peru-Bolivian Confederation.)

Commanders and leaders
Manuel Bulnes	Luis J. de Orbegoso

Strength
4,000–4,700 troops (Note: Colonel Nicolas José Prieto points out in his diary that at that time not all the military forces were available, thus discounting from the army those who were still on board the ships, sick, etc.); 4 pieces of artillery	3,200–3,500 troops 4 pieces of artillery

Casualties and losses
40 dead 141 wounded	~1,000 casualties 3 pieces of artillery and a weapons cache captured

The Battle of Portada de Guías (Spanish: Batalla de Portada de Guías), also known as the Battle of Guía (Spanish: Batalla de Guía) or Battle of Piñonate (Spanish: Batalla de Piñonate), took place between the Chilean Army (Note: In this battle there were a few dissident Peruvians who joined the ranks of the Chilean Army. The United Restoration Army would be formed after the establishment of Agustín Gamarra as Provisional President of Peru, who would be given the task of forming units of the Peruvian Army opposed to the Confederation that would fight in the next actions together with the Chilean restoration divisions.) and the secessionist Peruvian Republic in 1838, during the War of the Confederation.

== Background ==
The Second Restoring Expedition, made up of allied Peruvian and Chilean forces with the purpose of ending the Peru-Bolivian Confederation, was made up of 5,400 men under the command of Chilean General Manuel Bulnes. He was accompanied by Agustín Gamarra, Manuel Ignacio de Vivanco, Felipe Pardo y Aliaga, Manuel de Mendiburu, among other Peruvian exiles who proposed the restoration of the previous political situation in Peru.

The Supreme Protector of the Confederation, Andrés de Santa Cruz, was directing most of the Confederate army in southern Peru. Only one division, which was to operate in combination with the troops of North Peru, remained near Lima. The president of said state, Marshal Luis José de Orbegoso, at the instigation of General Domingo Nieto, rose up against Santa Cruz and declared the Confederation dissolved, later entering into talks with Bulnes about a possible alliance against Santa Cruz. But both chiefs distrusted each other and actually wanted to buy time: Orbegoso wanted to improve his military situation, while Bulnes wanted to give rest to his troops fatigued by the long journey from Valparaíso. Finally, alleging the vandalism to which the Chileans had indulged, Orbegoso's secretary declared the negotiations broken. According to these antecedents, Manuel Bulnes decided to disembark in Ancón, north of Lima, on August 7 and 8, 1838, in order to cut the enemy line. According to the Chilean agents who returned from the negotiations, the Peruvian forces amounted to 4,136 men on July 11, distributed as follows: 2,036 in Lima, 900 in Callao, and 1,200 in Pativilca.

Aware of the Chilean arrival, General Orbegoso concentrated his forces in Chancay for the defense of the capital, while the Restoration Army began their advance towards Lima. Meanwhile, General Domingo Nieto had placed himself in a good defensive position, in Chacra Cerro, a quarter of a league from the Copacabana Valley (place that the restorers occupied to start the march to Lima) with a total of approximately 3,200 men. Noticing it, General Bulnes paraded to the right and went to rest in the Collico hacienda. Nieto moved south, towards the Huaca Aznapuquio position, used by the royalists in 1821. Given this, Bulnes left Collico at 11 a.m. on August 16 and deployed his forces in front of the northern positions. Peruvians, doing everything on his side so that Nieto would attack him. After 45 minutes he continued his march towards Naranjal.

On the afternoon of August 18, the Chilean leader established his headquarters in La Legua, between Lima and Callao, and remained there on the 19th and 20th. Based on the reports that he obtained from the squadron that blocked the port of Callao and a reconnaissance carried out, Bulnes was informed that both Lima and Callao were almost unguarded, so he had the possibility of occupying both cities without fighting. But since he had General Nieto's forces to the north (in Aznapuquio) he did not do it, since he would have had to divide his forces to occupy the cities and confront Nieto.

At noon on August 21, by order of Bulnes, the restorers advanced to the Palao estate since he wanted to avoid a direct clash with the Orbegozo positions. At three in the afternoon the restoration forces, plus half of the flankers and two companies under the command of Generals Ramón Castilla and Remigio Deustua (father of the Peruvian philosopher Alejandro Deustua) halted in front of the Portada de Guías. The restorative army supported its right on the Rímac river and its left on the Amancaes hill.

On August 18, 1838, the restorers occupied the Concha farm and extended their lines to La Magdalena, for which it was necessary to garrison the Lima portals of Juan Simón and Guadalupe, while the gate of Callao was defended by Nieto and that of Monserrate by Vidal. Orbegoso stood in the Gamboa garden. The flat roofs near the walls were crowded with onlookers, who wanted to see the invaders. General Orbegoso, who had gone to the outskirts of Lima from Nieto's position, immediately gathered his forces, which were distributed along the wide road that connects La Legua with the Callao gate.

In a single line from right to left were the 2nd Ayacucho, Legion and No. 4 battalions. The Hussars of Junín were located behind and on the wings of the Legion battalion. The main bridge of Lima was occupied by 200 men from the Serenos battalion, who hid on the roofs of the houses and in the ornamental arch that existed over the bridge. On the other side of the river and part of the old city walls, at the height of Monserrate, the 1st Battalion of Ayacucho was located, under the command of General Domingo Nieto. The heights on the right were occupied by a company of grenadiers. And the stone bridge was defended by three pieces of artillery, a company and a group of armed neighbors.

The Peruvian general, learning that the restorative army was approaching the Portada de Guías, moved there and ordered his forces to go out and take up positions. Orbegoso and his officers had agreed days before not to fight in the open field and limit themselves to defending the city, since the number of the enemy was overwhelming. But such an agreement was not fulfilled and the combat was engaged in an improvised manner, without any planning. According to a statement made by Nieto, Orbegoso was pushed into fighting by the Santacrucistas who surrounded him.

== Order of battle ==
The order of battle was as follows:

== Battle ==
On August 21, General Orbegoso had ordered his soldiers to hide behind trees, rough terrain, and buildings. He also sent 500 horsemen with orders to embitter the restorative forces. At 02:30 in the afternoon, after having crossed a long gorge, the Restoration Army's vanguard, preceded by 25 jägers on horseback and commanded by General Ramón Castilla, reached a rocky area when they were attacked by enemy guerrillas. With the counterattack of the squadrons of lancers and jägers, the Restoration Army managed to continue its advance to Guías, but after an hour and a half of fighting, they ran out of ammunition. At that time they received the reinforcement of the 1st Restoration Division, whose Carampangue and Colchagua battalions, with the support of 2 artillery pieces, charged into the center of the north-Peruvian line. The fight was extraordinary violent, since the restoration troops felt the fire from the front, from the flanks and from the surrounding buildings, maintaining this situation for a long time.

Already at almost nightfall the situation was still indecisive, so General Bulnes ordered the Portales and Valparaíso battalions to advance on the right side and a company from the Carampangue to crown a height on the left, in order to break the North-Peruvian resistance. Given this, General Orbegoso ordered his cavalry to charge, but all his attempts failed, so it dispersed in retreat towards Lima. This abandonment of the cavalry affected the morale of the Peruvian defenders who quickly began to give way, falling back to the Lima stone bridge. During the combat, Peruvian Colonel Javier Panizo y Ramírez defended the bridge over the Rímac and was shot.

At the end of the day, the Restoration Army moved to the main square where General Domingo Nieto was with the Ayacucho battalion. Unable to rebuild or withdraw, Bulnes ordered Colonel Pedro Godoy, forcing the bridge that connects Malambo with Lima, to pursue them with the 2nd division, with which a massive bayonet charge was made, achieving at 08:30 the occupation of the Plaza Mayor.

General Nieto, seeing the battle lost, retired to the Real Felipe Fortress with the remains of his troops; For his part, General Orbegoso hid in the city; and as for Vidal, who was wounded, he withdrew from the battle and returned to Huaraz. The remaining Peruvian forces scattered.

According to Chilean sources, the casualties of Orbegoso's forces were around 1,000 men, including dead, wounded and prisoners. Restorative casualties were 40 dead and 141 wounded.

Peruvian historiography narrates that, after the battle, the city was subjected to looting and burning; while on the battlefield the wounded were "reviewed"—i.e. executed—which would explain the large number of dead and the small number of wounded on the Peruvian side. The victims included women and children, whose bodies were collected the next day.

== Aftermath ==
The occupation of Lima allowed the validity of the Peruvian Constitution of 1834 to be restored and the election of the Great Marshal Agustín Gamarra as provisional president of Peru (Note: This title was used by the Restorationists, since on the Confederate side there were presidents for each constituent state of the Confederation and the Supreme Protector, Andrés de Santa Cruz.) by decision of a meeting of neighbors, on August 24, 1838. Along with this, the organization of a Peruvian army began, with calls for the defeated fighters of Guías to join the Restorationists, which did not bear fruit. Similarly, in the first days of September, Colonel Juan Crisóstomo Torrico, in charge of organizing the Peruvian Legion, and Colonel Frisancho, of the Cazadores del Perú, only managed to recruit barely 500 men, distributed in 4 companies. This was due to the fact that in the area, most of the men were followers of General Orbegoso or the protector Andrés de Santa Cruz. Due to these events Ramón Castilla went to Chancay and General Antonio Gutiérrez de la Fuente embarked in Chorrillos towards the department of La Libertad to recruit men for the army but they did not succeed. Of course, the departments of La Libertad and Huaylas declared themselves in favor of Gamarra.

As for Orbegoso's army, several of those dispersed from the battle of Guías would take refuge in the Callao fortress, others would escape to the outskirts of Lima to form guerrillas to face the restorers.

Regarding their bosses, General Francisco Vidal would be proclaimed supreme boss in Huaraz, but after an agreement with Gamarra he became part of the Restorationist forces. On his side, General Nieto managed to go from Callao to Supe in the hope of gathering a new army to face the restorers. Orbegoso, after being hidden for a few days in Lima, went in disguise to the fortress in Callao, where he decided to confront the Restorationists.

Now, Bulnes and Gamarra would have to face, in the meantime, three problems that were difficult to solve: The siege of Callao, the fight against the guerrillas around the capital and the increase in the army with the formation of Peruvian units. Meanwhile, the protector Andrés de Santa Cruz was preparing to move his army to attack Lima, occupied by the Restorationists, with his forces.
