= War of the Confederation =

1836–39 war between Chile and Argentina and Peru-Bolivia

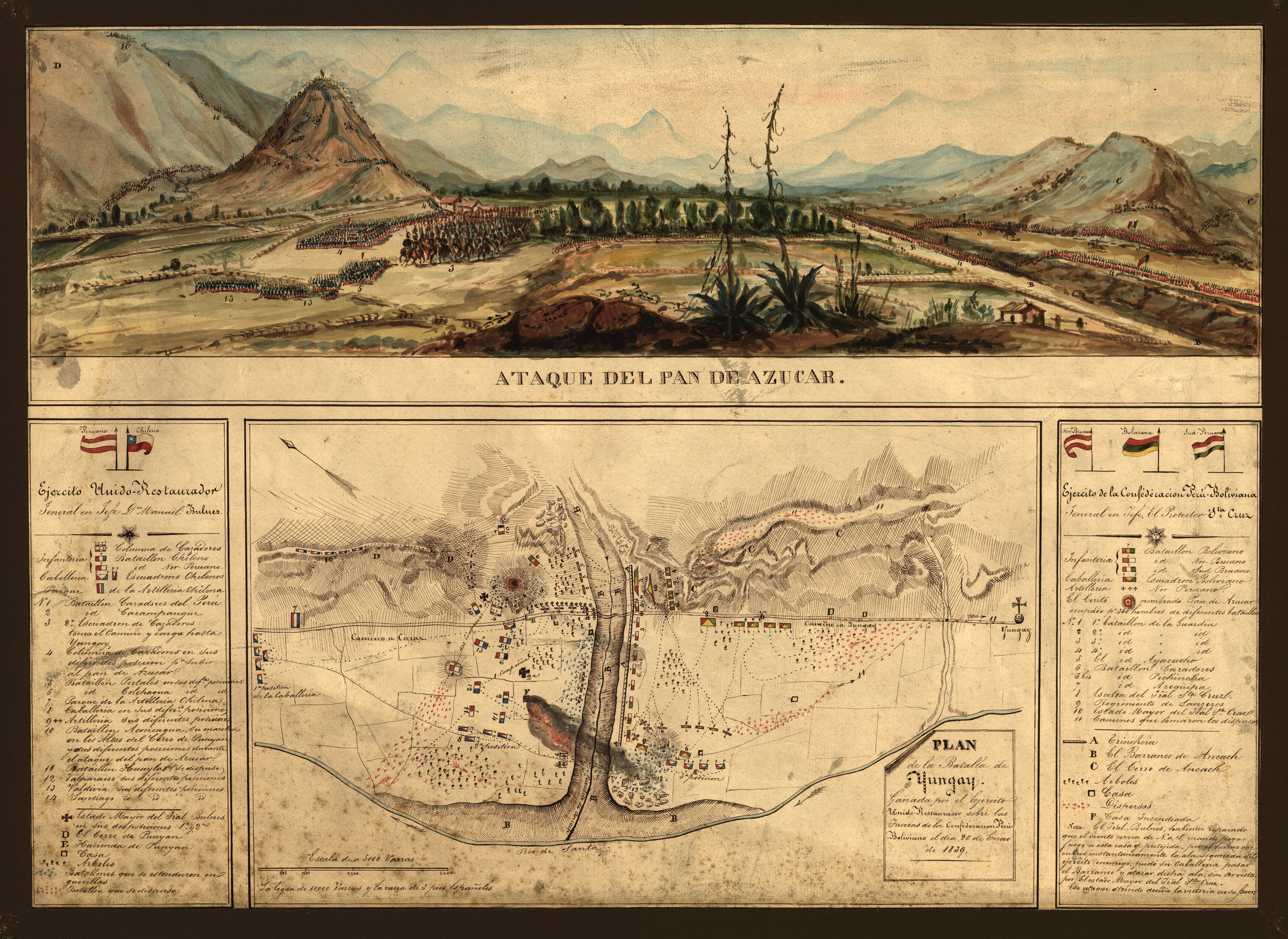
- Topographical plan of the Battle of Yungay, 1839
Date	1836–1839
Location	Peru, Bolivian department of Tarija, Argentine provinces of Jujuy and Salta, Bolivian Cobija port, Chilean coast and the Gulf of Guayaquil
Result	Chilean–Peruvian restorationist victory; Fall and dissolution of the Peruvian-Bolivian Confederation; Peruvian reunification and restoration of the republics of Peru and Bolivia; Exile of Andrés de Santa Cruz; Iquicha War of 1839; Peace agreement between Bolivia and the Argentine Confederation, and the Argentine territories occupied during the war are returned

Belligerents
United Restoration; Chile; Peruvian restorers; La Fuente government (1837); Gamarra government (1838–1839); Argentina (since 1837)	Peru–Bolivian Confederation; Orbegoso government; (only in 1838)

Commanders and leaders
Joaquín Prieto; M. Blanco Encalada; Manuel Bulnes; Roberto Simpson; C. García del Postigo; A. G. de la Fuente; Agustín Gamarra; Juan M. de Rosas; Alejandro Heredia	A. de Santa Cruz; Otto P. Braun; José T. Morán; Jean Blanchet †; Luis J. de Orbegoso; Domingo Nieto

Strength
United Restoration Army; Chilean Army; 2,898 (1837); 8,200 (1838–1839) (Note: In July 1838, 5,400 soldiers of the Chilean Army commanded by General Bulnes sailed from Chile to Peru. Later they were joined that year by an auxiliary reinforcement of 800 Chilean soldiers. Then 2,000 recruits were organized in Chile, but they did not sail to Peru because the war was over. In the decisive battle of Yungay there were between 4,000–4,467 Chileans.); Peruvian restorers; 402 (1837); 3,000 approx. (1838–1839) (Note: After the liberation of Lima in August 1838, by anti-confederation rebels supported by the Chilean army commanded by General Bulnes, the government of General Gamarra was formed, which began the organization of the Peruvian army. At first, he only managed to gather 500 recruits, but with the passage of the war he increased to 3,000 recruits. In the decisive battle of Yungay, only 800 to 1,000 Peruvians would participated.); 1 warship (only in 1838) (Note: On 30 October 1838, by virtue of a prior agreement between the Chilean government and that of Gamarra, the brig Arequipeño was handed over to the latter. On November of that same year, the brig was captured by the Confederate privateer fleet.); Chilean Navy; 8 warships (1836); 8 warships (early 1837) and 18 transports (first expedition of 1837); 8 warships (early 1838) and 26 transports (second expedition of 1838); 8–9 warships (late 1838, and 1839); North Argentine Army; 300–400 (1837); 3,500 (1838)	Confederate Army; 12,000 (distributed throughout the territory); Confederate Navy; 4 warships and 2 transports (1836); 5 warships and 5 gunboats (1837); 6 warships (early 1838); 3 gunboats (late 1838); Privateers; 2 warships (late 1838); 4 warships (1839); Orbegoso Army; 3,900 approx. (Note: The army that Orbegoso managed to gather in Lima was about 3,400 soldiers. It also had 500 soldiers who protected Callao.)

Casualties and losses
Unknown	Unknown

The War of the Confederation (Spanish: Guerra de la Confederación) was a military confrontation waged by the United Restoration Army, the alliance of the land and naval forces of Chile and the Restoration Army of Peru, formed in 1836 by Peruvian soldiers opposed to the confederation, and the Argentine Confederation against the Peru–Bolivian Confederation between 1836 and 1839. As a result of the Salaverry-Santa Cruz War, the Peru–Bolivian Confederation was created by General Andrés de Santa Cruz, which caused a power struggle in southern South America, with Chile and the Argentine Confederation, as both distrusted this new and powerful political entity, seeing their geopolitical interests threatened. After some incidents, Chile and the Argentine Confederation declared war on the Peru–Bolivian Confederation, although both waged war separately.

Chile since 1836 carried out the war with Peruvian dissidents who were enemies of Santa Cruz. During the war, one of Santa Cruz's subordinates, General Luis José de Orbegoso, rebelled against him in 1838 to restore Peru with a new government. However, by not allying with Chile, he ended up being defeated by Chilean forces. On the other hand, the Argentine Confederation did not achieve any significant advance between 1837 and 1838, paralyzing its war front and losing some territories north of Jujuy, notwithstanding the importance for the Rosas government of the war against Bolivia as an instrument of political cohesion at the level of the Argentine Confederation, Rosas had enemies and problems on many fronts, among which it is worth mentioning the intrigues of the unitary emigrants in the Banda Oriental (Uruguay) and Chile, and the problem posed to the commercial interests of Buenos Aires by the conflict with France, which would soon lead to the French blockade of the Río de la Plata. Due to the presence of these multiple conflicts, Rosas could not divert his attention or his resources in the war he had decided against Bolivia. Finally, Chilean-Peruvian forces of the so-called Restorative Army led by General Manuel Bulnes, obtain a decisive victory in the battle of Yungay in 1839 while Andrés de Santa Cruz had been overthrown from the post of President of Bolivia by general José Miguel de Velasco who betrayed him before knowing the result of the battle. At the same time the general José Ballivián leaving the battlefield and mutinied in La Paz along with Bolivian reserve battalions. Also Colonel Guilarte, who had 700 soldiers in command, had abandoned his position and deserted without firing any shots. This battle caused the dissolution of the Peru–Bolivian Confederation, the exile of Santa Cruz, the restoration of Peru and Bolivia, among other consequences.

Historians have proposed different long-lasting effects of the war including the consolidation of the ideas of Peruvian and Chilean nationality.

== Background ==
The creation in 1836 of the Peru–Bolivian Confederation by Marshal Andrés de Santa Cruz caused great alarm in the neighbouring countries. The potential power of this confederation aroused the opposition of Argentina and, above all, Chile, due not only to its size but also to the perceived threat that such a rich state signified for the area. Diego Portales, arguably the most important Chilean statesman of the 19th century, who at the time was the power behind president José Joaquín Prieto Vial, was very concerned that the new Confederacy would break the regional balance of power and even be a threat to Chilean independence, and so became immediately its enemy.

But that was just one of the reasons behind the war. On a deeper level, both countries were in a heated competition for the control of the commercial routes on the Pacific; and for the Chileans especially, whose relations with independent Peru had already been strained by economic problems centering on the rivalry between their ports of Callao and Valparaíso. For the North-Peruvian landowners also, the Confederacy was viewed as a most serious threat to their economic interests.

=== Tariff war ===
The direct conflict between the two countries started with a simple tariff disagreement. In January 1835, Gen. Felipe Salaverry, by then president of Peru, signed a Treaty of Friendship, Commerce and Navigation with Chile. When President Salaverry was replaced by General Luis Orbegoso in Peru, the treaty was declared null and void on February 14, 1836. In the meantime, the Confederacy was already taking form. In order to force Chile to renegotiate, Peru raised its tariff on Chilean wheat from 12 cents to 3 pesos – an increase of 2,400%. Chile responded by raising the tariffs on Peruvian sugar by the same amount. The hostilities started to grow until the Mexican minister (ambassador) to Chile offered to mediate in the conflict. Open conflict was averted for the time being.

=== Freire Expedition ===
After the victory of the conservative party in the Chilean Civil War of 1829–1830, former Chilean president General Ramón Freire y Serrano was exiled to Lima. He managed to obtain a small subsidy from the Confederate government to equip a frigate and try to wrestle power from the Prieto administration. The adventure was a quick failure. The sloop Orbegoso was captured by the frigate Monteagudo on July 28, 1836, and became part of the Chilean fleet. In the meantime, Freire who had managed to capture the city of Ancud was defeated and captured himself, being sent this time to the prison-island of Robinson Crusoe. Later he was exiled to Australia.

== Escalation ==
=== Raid on Callao ===
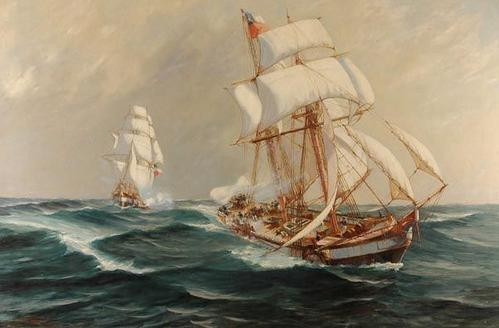
The Peruviana sails under Chilean flag after her capture in Callao by the Aquiles. Oilpainting of Álvaro Casanova Zenteno.

The Freire Expedition had a secondary result. Portales decided to take the offensive and staged a surprise raid to prevent further interference by the Confederate government in Chilean internal affairs. He gave command of the small Chilean fleet to the Spanish sailor Victorino Garrido and ordered him to raid the Confederate fleet that was stationed in the port of Callao. Garrido, who arrived with the brigantine Aquiles on a goodwill visit, staged a silent attack on the night of August 21, 1836, managing to capture 3 confederate ships: the Santa Cruz, Arequipeño and Peruviana.

=== Chilean declaration of war ===
Instead of immediately going to war, Marshal Andrés de Santa Cruz tried to negotiate with Chile. The Chilean Congress sent Mariano Egaña as plenipotentiary to negotiate a treaty based on several points: the payments of the outstanding international debts owed by Peru to Chile, the limitation of the outstanding armies, commercial agreements, compensation to Chile for the Freire Expedition, and the dissolution of the Confederation. Santa Cruz agreed to everything but the dissolution. Chile responded by declaring war on December 28, 1836. The international situation was not favorable to the Chilean interests. Marshal Santa Cruz and the Confederation had been diplomatically recognized by the principal world powers with interests in the region (Great Britain, France and the United States), while the possible Chilean allies (Argentina and Ecuador) had decided to remain neutral in the conflict.

=== Argentine declaration of war ===
Nonetheless, the involvement of Marshal Santa Cruz in Argentina's internal affairs by his continued support to the opponents of caudillo Juan Manuel de Rosas, moved this country to also declare war on May 9, 1837, in support of the northern province of Tucumán, which was threatened by Santa Cruz's forces. France supported Santa Cruz's war effort by imposing a naval blockade over Buenos Aires, an ill-fated attempt to remove Rosas from power. Also, France took advantage of the Uruguayan Civil War and the Argentine Civil Wars, supporting Fructuoso Rivera and Juan Lavalle against Manuel Oribe and Rosas.

In a letter that he sent to Governor Heredia on January 10, 1837, Rosas acknowledged that he was not in a position to confront General Santa Cruz:

On how to make effective the remedy of force in circumstances such as these, in which the Republic does not have, nor can it suddenly organize, a line army capable of imposing fear and respect on President Santa Cruz, HE Sr. Governor of the province of Tucumán as protector of those of Salta, Jujuy and Catamarca, is the one who must take the direction, agreeing with the respective Governors of the said Provinces, since the undersigned placed at an immense distance from them, without practical knowledge of the territory in which it must operate, nor the elements of action it can count on to make President Santa Cruz enter into his duty, is not in a position to present an operations plan, without exposing himself to making major mistakes.

Even though Chile and Argentina were acting against the same perceived threat, both countries went to war independently, due to the intense dislike between Portales and Rosas, and both countries continued to act separately throughout the whole course of the conflict. In 1837 Santa Cruz's forces defeated an Argentine army sent to topple him. If, as Rosas himself claimed, the forces of the Argentine Confederation were not in a position to sustain operations in the North against the Bolivian armies, why was Rosas determined to war against the government of Santa Cruz? The obvious answer is that the Governor of Buenos Aires calculated that the Chilean forces were far superior to those of Santa Cruz, and that the alliance with the Chilean government would destroy the nest of anti-riot conspirators that Bolivia had become. For Chile, the war against the Peruvian-Bolivian Confederation was decisive: commercial supremacy and the balance of power in the Pacific were discussed. For the Argentine Confederation, on the other hand, this war was more important for internal politics than economic and strategic. The economic damages suffered by the Rosas government because of Santa Cruz were relatively limited, the main one being the 40% tax on overseas merchandise brought into Bolivia from the Argentine provinces. These economic damages did not in themselves justify a war and in principle could be resolved peacefully. If Rosas finally decided in favor of the war, it was because of his implications against his internal enemies, and also because the eventual defeat of Santa Cruz would perhaps allow him to demand the restitution of the province of Tarija. But the latter concerned more the Northern provinces than Rosas himself and the Litoral provinces. Finally, and as a consequence of these considerations, Rosas resolved that it would be the northern provinces that, in defense of their immediate interests, would bear the brunt of the warlike actions.

=== Assassination of Portales ===
The Chilean government, in order to bolster its sagging standing with public opinion (which was opposed to a war they did not understand), imposed martial law and asked for (and obtained) extraordinary legislative powers from Congress. Early in 1837 a Court Martial Law was approved and given jurisdiction over all citizens for the duration of the war. The opposition to the Prieto administration immediately accused Portales of tyranny, and started a heated press campaign against him personally and the unpopular war in general.

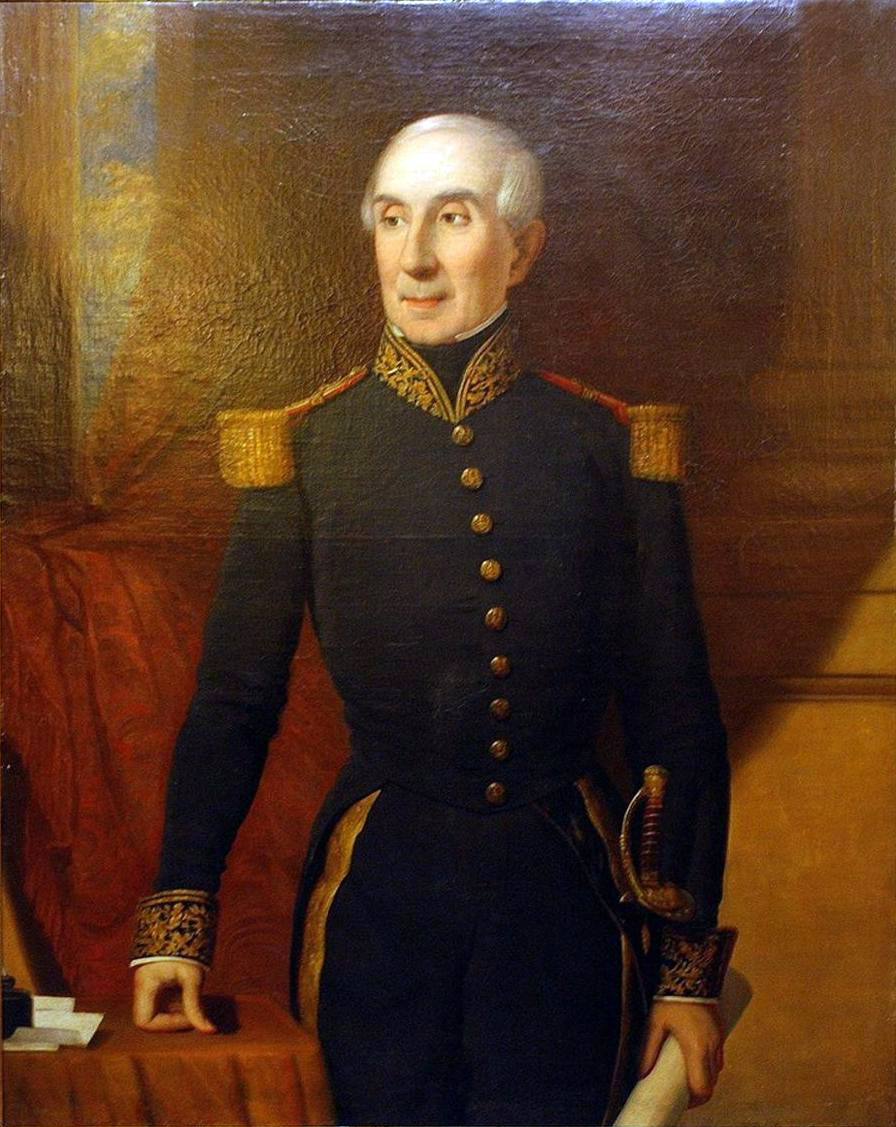
Chilean Rear Admiral Manuel Blanco Encalada

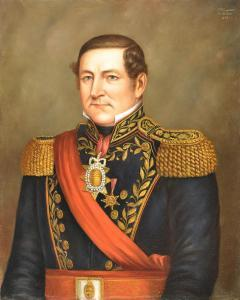
Argentine General Juan Manuel de Rosas

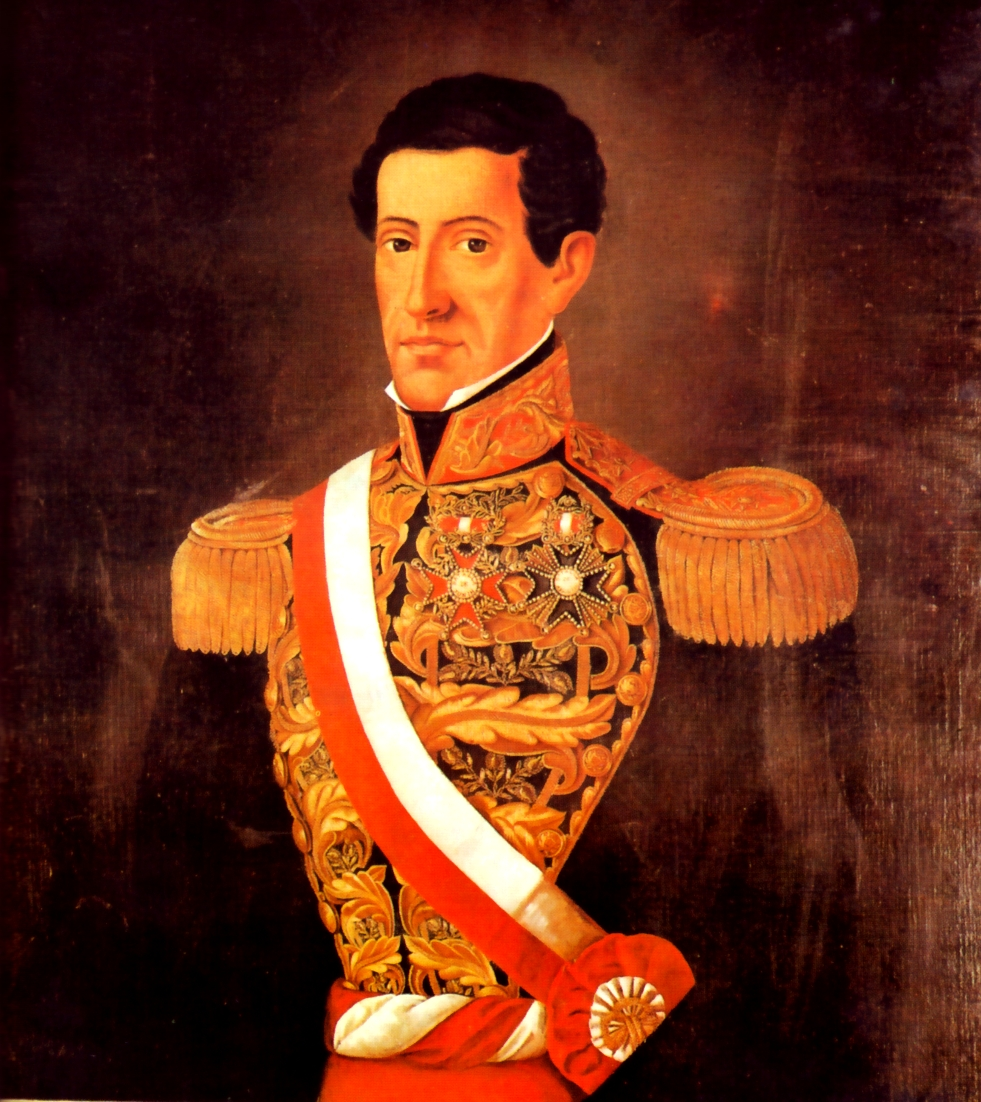
Peruvian General Agustin Gamarra

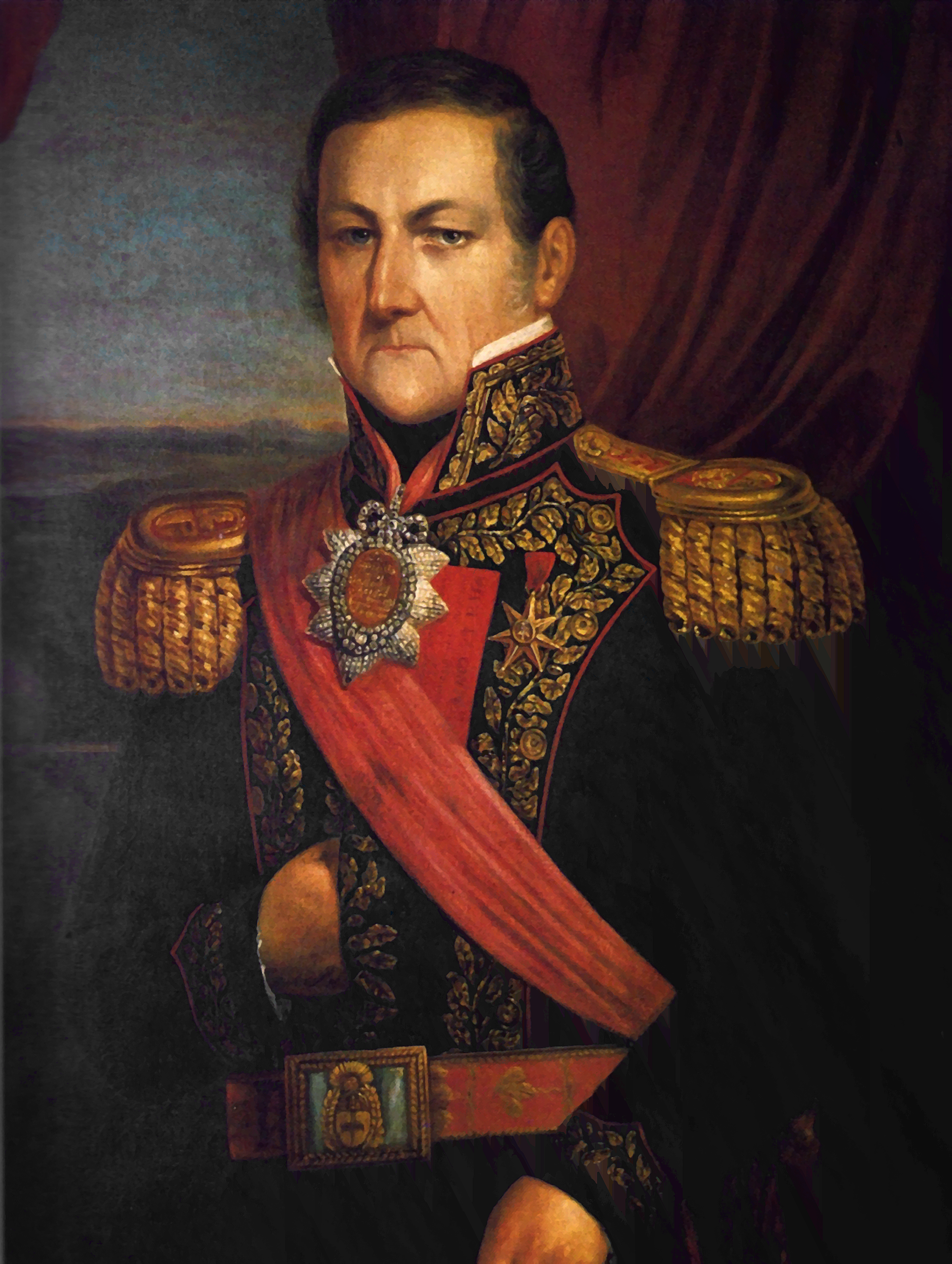
Juan Manuel de Rosas, Head of Foreign Relations of the Argentine Confederation

Political and public opposition to war immediately affected the army, fresh still from the purges of the civil war of 1829-1830. On June 4, 1837, Coronel José Antonio Vidaurre, commander of the "Maipo" regiment, captured and imprisoned Portales while he was reviewing troops at the army barracks in Quillota. Vidaurre immediately proceeded to attack Valparaíso on the mistaken belief that public opinion opposed to the war would support him and topple the government. Rear Admiral Manuel Blanco Encalada, in charge of the defense, defeated him right outside the port at the Battle of Baron. Captain Santiago Florín, who was in charge of Portales, had him shot when he heard of the news, on June 6, 1837. Most of the conspirators were subsequently captured and executed.

This murder, which was perceived as having been orchestrated by Marshal Santa Cruz, turned the tide of Chilean public opinion against the Confederation. The government later had martial law revoked nationwide and the country rallied behind the government. The war became a holy cause, and Portales its martyr.

== First campaign ==
=== Confederate naval campaign ===
The first stage of the war was fought at sea. Both sides tried to take control of it from the very beginning. The Confederate fleet was composed of the Socabaya, Confederación and Congreso and it put out to sea in November 1837. They first attacked the Juan Fernández garrison, which they captured, liberating the prisoners there. Then they attacked the ports of Talcahuano, San Antonio, Huasco and Caldera.

=== Chilean expedition ===
In the meantime, the Chilean government was preparing an expedition to put a quick end to the conflict. In September 1837 it sent a fleet carrying a Chilean expeditionary force of approximately 2,800 troops under the command of Admiral Manuel Blanco Encalada. The Chilean army landed at Islay in southern Peru in October, 1837, occupying the city of Arequipa after a long and arduous march, during which the Chileans were decimated by disease. But the invading army failed to find the local support that they had been led to believe they would encounter against the Confederate government. While Admiral Blanco Encalada was immersed in never-ending negotiations with the local leaders, Marshal Santa Cruz quietly surrounded the city with his army and effectively blockaded the invading army inside.

=== Treaty of Paucarpata ===
Treaty of Paucarpata
- Type: Peace treaty
- Signed: 18 November 1837
- Location: Arequipa
- Signatories: Peru–Bolivian Confederation; Chile
- Languages: Spanish

Surrounded and out-manoeuvered, and following an encounter at Paucarpata with an army under the command of Santa Cruz, Admiral Blanco Encalada was forced to sign a peace treaty. The Treaty of Paucarpata was signed on November 17, 1837, and agreed to the devolution of all captured ships by Chile, the restoration of commercial relations between both nations, the withdrawal of all Chilean troops from Confederate territories and the payment by the Confederacy of the former Peruvian foreign debts with Chile. The Chilean troops were reembarked.

When Admiral Blanco Encalada returned rather ignominiously to Valparaíso with the fleet and the army in December, 1837, the scandal was gigantic. The Chilean government and the Chilean public opinion repudiated the treaty in indignation. Admiral Blanco Encalada as was thrown into jail and tried for high treason, together with his advisor Antonio José de Irisarri, who had refused to even return to Chile. Both were eventually acquitted, though Irisarri never returned.

== Naval battle of Islay ==
After the treaty of Paucarpata had been repudiated, the Chilean government again dispatched its fleet, composed of 5 ships (Aquiles and Arequipeño, the corvettes Libertad and Valparaíso and the Chilean frigate Monteagudo) under the command of Roberto Simpson, to disrupt Peruvian commerce. On January 12, 1838, they met a Confederate squadron near the Peruvian port of Islay, on what is known as the Naval Battle of Islay. The Confederate squadron was conformed by the Socabaya, Junín and Fundador under the command of commander Juan José Panizo. Simpson attacked but Panizo managed to hold him off for several hours until able to escape under the cover of darkness. Both sides claimed victory, but the result was mostly a stalemate that did not affect the course of the war.

== Second campaign – Chilean army ==
By mid-1838 Chile had obtained naval superiority and dispatched General Manuel Bulnes Prieto heading a Chilean army.

=== Battle of Portada de Guías ===
Although their advance was delayed by harassment from small groups of Confederate forces, the Chileans were finally able to lay siege to Lima. The first encounter between the two armies was the Battle of Portada de Guías which took place right outside the city of Lima on August 21, 1838. The Chilean army, under the command of General Bulnes, defeated the Confederate garrison loyal to General Orbegoso. The Chilean force occupied Lima at the end of October, 1838 but abandoned it on November 3 on hearing of the approach of a large Bolivian army under General Santa Cruz. The Chileans withdrew by land and sea toward Huacho. In the meantime, the principal citizens had met and called an open congress that proclaimed General Gamarra as Provisional President of Peru.

=== Naval battle of Casma ===
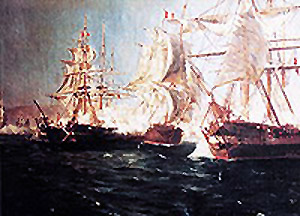
Battle of Casma

On January 12, 1839, both fleets met in a naval battle at Casma, where the French corsairs fighting on the Confederate side were defeated by Admiral Simpson's Chilean fleet. On that day the Chilean fleet, which was protecting the transports used to mobilize the invading Chilean army, were attacked in the port of Casma by the Confederate fleet, composed of the Esmond, Mexicana, Arequipeño and Peru, under the command of French sailor Jean Blanchet. The battle lasted for several hours until the final repulse of the Confederate fleet. During the battle Blanchet was killed and the Confederate ship Arequipeño was sunk, but not before the Chilean fleet had been badly battered. Nonetheless, the resounding defeat of the Confederate fleet at Casma by the smaller Chilean squadron left Chile in absolute control of the southeastern Pacific.

=== Battle of Buin ===
Meanwhile, Santa Cruz failed to exploit the Chilean retreat fully, despite successes in several small skirmishes culminating in the first direct encounter between the bulk of both armies around the bridge of Buin on January 6, 1839. Santa Cruz' vanguard engaged Bulnes' rearguard at the margins of the Santa River, under a heavy storm. The battle ended in a draw, as Bulnes resumed their march north, and Santa Cruz continued to pursue them.

=== Battle of Yungay ===
Marshal Santa Cruz occupied the town of Yungay with the intention to cut the provisions and to strangle the Chilean Expedition. After Buin, Santa Cruz was trying to finish off the Chilean Expedition in order to stabilize the internal situation in the country and to avoid any more uprisings against him. Here is where the boldness of General Bulnes could be observed, when instead of retiring and looking for a more suitable position, turned around against Santa Cruz ready to attack.

The Battle of Yungay took place on January 20, 1839. In this battle, the Confederates, under the command of Marshal Santa Cruz, waited for Bulnes' offensive well defended on the Pan de Azúcar and Punyán hills, near the town of Yungay, and the rest were deployed over the Ancash River bank. The battle started very early on the morning and finished late in the evening. The Chileans first took the Punyán and Pan de Azúcar hills, and later attacked the bulk of the Confederates on the river. In the end, Bulnes crushed Santa Cruz' army. The Confederates had over 2,400 casualties (mostly dead) and more than 1,600 soldiers were made prisoners, while the Chilean army had about 1,300 dead and 400 injured.

After the battle, General Manuel Bulnes was proclaimed as Grand Marshal of Ancash by General Gamarra.

== Aftermath ==
General Bulnes again assumed the initiative. After the defeat of the Confederate army at Yungay on January 20, the Chileans commenced a second push southward, occupying Lima for the second time in April. Santa Cruz had already fled to Ecuador, and both the war and the short-lived Peru-Bolivian Confederation now came to an end.

On August 25, 1839, General Agustín Gamarra after assuming as president of Peru, officially declared the dissolution of the Confederation and of the North and South-Peruvian Republics, and the merging of these states back into one to be called again Peru.

The Confederate defeat led to the exile of Santa Cruz, first to Guayaquil, in Ecuador, then to Chile and finally to Europe, where he died. The Chilean troops left on October 19, 1839, after having achieved the goal of dissolving the Confederation and affirmed General Gamarra as President of Peru.

Nonetheless, General Gamarra decided to pursue the war against Bolivia on his own. He was not against the idea of merging Peru and Bolivia into one political unity, but against the idea of this union being led by Bolivia. He invaded this country, but the Peruvian army was decisively defeated at the Battle of Ingaví on November 18, 1841, where General Gamarra himself was killed. The Bolivian army under General José Ballivián then mounted an offensive managing to capture the Peruvian port of Arica. Subsequently, the Peruvian army carried out a counteroffensive, forcing the withdrawal of all Bolivian forces that occupied Peruvian territory. Later, both sides signed a peace in 1842, putting a final end to the war.

Finally, the war also affected the development of the Chilean state. During the conflict, the army tripled in size, while taxation and the central bureaucracy expanded. After the victory at Yungay (1839), the Conservative Republic entered a period of greater political stability. The government also expanded its security forces and state bureaucracy, strengthening institutions that had grown during the war.

== See also ==
- Chincha Islands War
- Peru–Bolivian Confederation
- War of the Pacific
