= Peruvian Republic (1837) =

Secessionist state in western South America from October to November 1837

Peruvian Republic República Peruana
- 1837–1837
- Flag Emblem
- Motto: Firme y feliz por la Unión
- Anthem: National Anthem of Peru
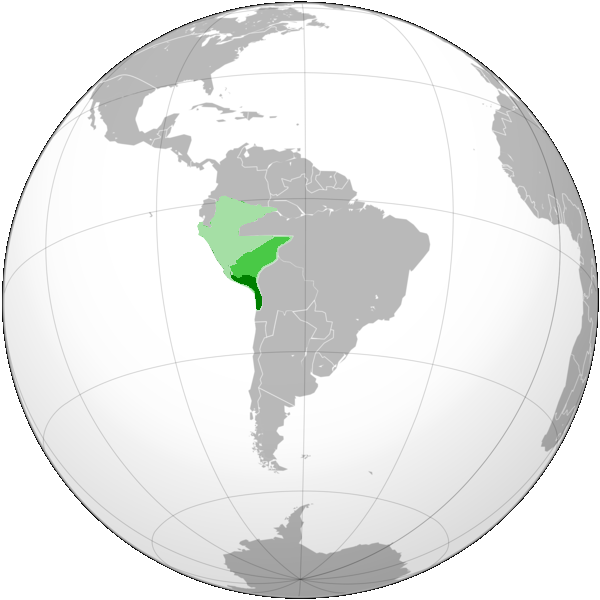
- Capital: Lima (de jure); Arequipa (de facto)
- Government: Unitary presidential republic
- Supreme Chief
  - 17 October–17 November, 1837: Antonio Gutiérrez de la Fuente
- Historical era: War of the Confederation
  - Proclaimed: October 17, 1837
  - Disestablished: November 17, 1837
Preceded by	Succeeded by
Peru-Bolivia	Peru-Bolivia

The Peruvian Republic was a state that declared itself independent from the Peru–Bolivian Confederation in 1837 under the nominal leadership of Antonio Gutiérrez de la Fuente as Supreme Chief of Peru.

This ephemeral state, although it claimed the entire territory of Peru, barely had control over Arequipa, and saw its end when its troops were cornered by the Confederate Army, and forced to sign the Paucarpata Peace Treaty.

== History ==
The rivalry that existed between the ports of Callao and Valparaíso worsened as a result of the establishment of the Peru–Bolivian Confederation, which led to the souring of relations between the Confederation and Chile. A tariff war soon began between both states, and Luis José de Orbegoso's support of Ramón Freire's failed expedition against Diego Portales worsened the situation. Thus, the Congress of Chile approved the declaration of war on December 26, 1836, claiming that Andrés de Santa Cruz's rule over Peru was illegitimate, and that his influence threatened the integrity of other South American nations, as seen by Orbegoso's support for the attempted invasion of Chile by Freire, specifically pointing out the attempt on Portales. Portales was later assassinated in Valparaíso after a mutiny broke out in Quillota, leading to preparations for the invasion of South Peru.

The first "Restorative Expedition" of the United Restoration Army left Valparaíso on September 15, 1837, landing in Quilca, and occupying Arequipa on October 12. The Confederate Navy captured the Juan Fernández Islands on November 14.

On November 17, after the Chileans were surrounded by Peruvian troops, the Treaty of Paucarpata was signed by Manuel Blanco Encalada under the guarantee of Great Britain, through which the occupation was undone six days later and the Peruvian ships captured by Chile were to be returned. After Blanco Encalada's troops arrived in Valparaíso, he was met with hostile demonstrations and the Chilean government repudiated the treaty of Paucarpata.

== See also ==
- Peruvian Republic (1838–1839)

== Bibliography ==
- Basadre Grohmann, Jorge (2014). Historia de la República del Perú [1822-1933]. Vol. 2. El Comercio. ISBN 978-612-306-353-5.
- Tamayo Herrera, José (1985). Nuevo Compendio de Historia del Perú. Editorial Lumen.
