= Northern Peru =

Northern Peru could refer to

- Republic of North Peru, one of the three republics within the short-lived Peru–Bolivian Confederation of the 19th century
- Republic of North Peru (1838–1839), another short-lived state that seceded from the Peru–Bolivian Confederation in 1838
- Loreto Region, Peru's present-day northernmost region, covering almost one-third of the country's territory
- Amazonas Region, located just west of Loreto Region
- Tumbes Region, Peru's northernmost coastal region, about 4,000 square kilometers (1,500 sq mi) in area
- Piura Region, a much larger coastal region, immediately south of Tumbes
- Cajamarca Region, between the regions of Amazonas and Piura

== See also ==
- Regions of Peru
