= United Restoration Army =

Chilean–Peruvian Army

- Ejército Unido Restaurador
- Active: 1837; 1838–1839
- Allegiance: Chile (Peru) Peruvian dissidents: (Peru) La Fuente government (1837); (Peru) Gamarra government (1838–39)
- Branch: Chilean Army; Restoration Army of Peru
- Type: Field army
- Engagements: War of the Confederation; Iquicha War of 1839

Commanders
- Chief Generals: Manuel Blanco Encalada (1837); Manuel Bulnes (1838–39)

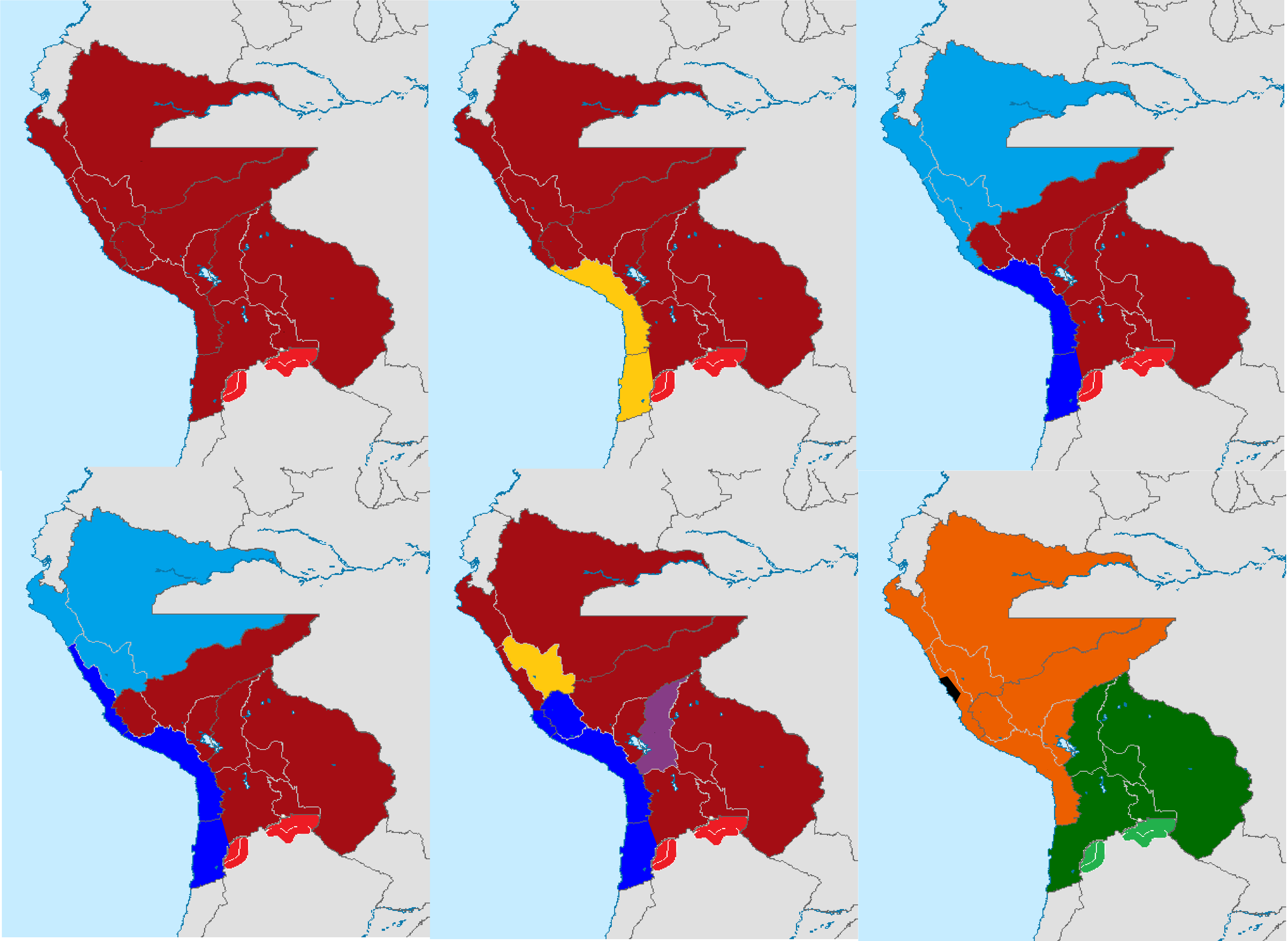
Dissolution of Peru-Bolivia: Peru-Bolivia Controlled by the United Restoration Army First Provisional Government of Peru Northern Peruvian Republic Second Provisional Government of Peru Provisional Government of Bolivia New Peruvian State New Bolivian State Controlled by the United Restoration Army during the restoration De facto borders after the dissolution Disputed between Peru-Bolivia and Argentina Disputed between Bolivia and Argentina

The United Restoration Army, also called simply as the Restoration Army, was a land military force that operated between the years 1837 and 1839, which had the objective of ending the Peru-Bolivian Confederation, led by General Andrés de Santa Cruz, and restore the independence of Peru to its situation prior to the Salaverry-Santa Cruz War.

This military force was made up of the Chilean Army and the army of the dissident governments formed in Peru, first that of Antonio Gutiérrez de la Fuente in 1837 and then that of Agustín Gamarra between 1838 and 1839. Its first commander was Manuel Blanco Encalada in the failed expedition of 1837. During the second expedition of 1838-1839, Manuel Bulnes Prieto was appointed as its general in chief.

Among its members were the North Peruvian military and politicians Juan Crisóstomo Torrico and Ramón Castilla, among others, who were exiled in Chile. There were also General Manuel Ignacio de Vivanco, Andrés Martínez and the politician Felipe Pardo y Aliaga, who negotiated the deal with Chile to intervene in favor of the North-Peruvian State, joining forces in order to break the Confederation. Likewise, former North Peruvian president Agustín Gamarra and his followers were also refugees, who finally formed an alliance with Chile in 1838 to establish a new government in Peru. After the war, the military campaigns were paid by Peru to the government of Chile.

The defeat of the Peru-Bolivian Confederation occurred in the town of Villa de Yungay, in the Department of Huaylas on January 20, 1839. In commemoration of this victory, the Department of Huaylas took the name of the Department of Ancash, as it is known today.

Later the term was used again during the Peruvian revolutions where one of the parties called restoration to the cause they defended, such was the case of the revolution led by General Mariano Ignacio Prado in 1865.

== See also ==
- Restoration Army of Peru
