= Iquicha War of 1839 =

1839 conflict in South America

- Part of the War of the Confederation
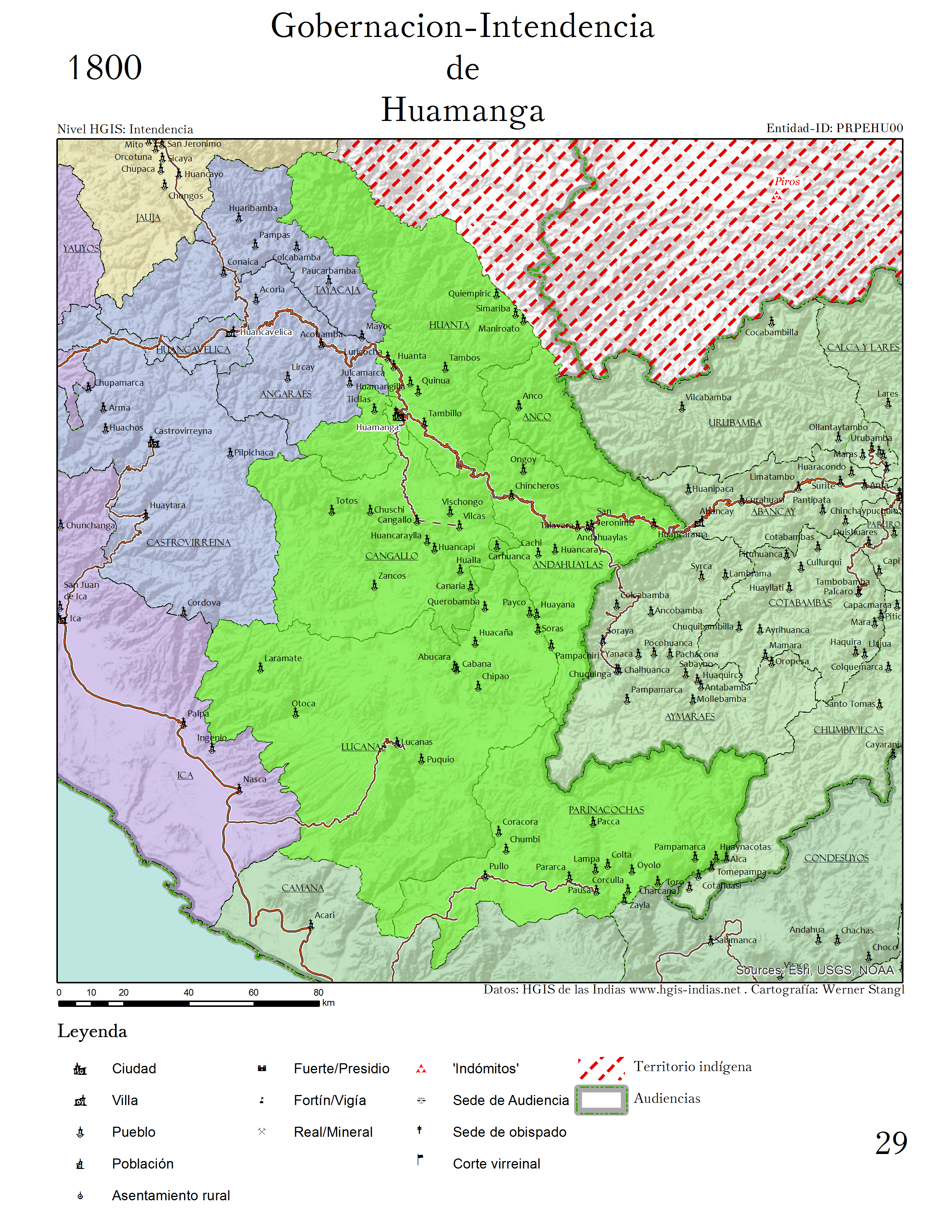
- Map of the Iquichan Republic.
Date	March–November 1839
Location	Huanta, Iquicha (now Ayacucho)
Result	Peruvian–Chilean victory; Continue the persecution of Royalist; Treaty of Yanallay signed; Huachaca exiles himself to Apurímac
Territorial changes	Definitive annexation of Iquicha and renamed Ayacucho

Belligerents
(Chile) United Restoration Army	Iquicha; Supported by: Spanish Empire

Commanders and leaders
(Peru) Manuel Lopera	Antonio Huachaca; Tadeo Choque (surrendered)

Strength
1,000; 2,000	7,000

Casualties and losses
600 casualties 75 casualties	3,000 killed 4,000 surrender

The Second Iquichan War, Second Iquicha campaign or Iquicha War of 1839 was a brief armed conflict during and after the War of the Confederation between the United Restoration Army against indigenous peasants from Huantaand troops confederates who tried to defend the defeated Peru–Bolivian Confederation.

== Background ==
On July 24, 1833, the Callao Battalion and several squadrons of the Hussars of Junín regiment rebelled in Ayacucho under the command of Captains Alejandro Deustua and Tomás Flores, assassinating the prefect, Colonel Juan Antonio González, and the head of the military department, Colonel Mariano Guillén, and rebelled on the side of the Iquichans. On August 15 they confronted Generals Pedro Pablo Bermúdez and Miguel de San Román and the Piquisa Battalion in Pultunchara. Then, on October 26, General Felipe Santiago Salaverry revolted in Cajamarca but was defeated at the Garita de Moche by Juan Francisco de Vidal on November 19.

For this reason, in the Peruvian Civil War of 1834, the Iquichans supported the liberal president Luis José de Orbegoso against the coup of the conservative generals Pedro Pablo Bermúdez and Agustín Gamarra, a key figure in politics of the time, and an enemy of the republiqueta. During his presidency, Gamarra had favored the merchants of Lima and neglected the rest of the country, especially the rural areas and their population.

After defeating the revolt in the capital, Orbegoso had to face Gamarra in the southern highlands of the country seeking an alliance with the inhabitants of Huanta. The liberals mobilized an army of 4,000 Indians under the command of landowner Juan José Urbina, who knew how to unify under his command republicans and monarchists. He had to face the conservatives, who mobilized four to five thousand combatants in the area. In April he seized Huanta and Huamanga, and a month later the civil war ended with the victory of the Liberals.

== Conflict ==
In 1836, the Iquichianos adhered to the idea of the Peru-Bolivian Confederation seen as "the continuation of the Empire by other means", for which Huachaca participated in the wars of the Confederation between 1836 and 1839. In 1838 Huachaca became Justice of the Peace and Governor of the Carhuaucra district and Supreme Chief of the Republic of Iquicha.

The Iquichans first supported the Confederation in their support of Andrés de Santa Cruz during the Salaverry-Santa Cruz War, since "he came to respond to the demands of the southern Andean groups who, since at least 1814, have defended a more decentralized country, in which they take into account the interests of the regional elites against the centralist coastal hegemonic groups." In March 1839 he took up arms against the Restoration Army and put Huanta under siege to no avail.

=== Treaty of Yanallay ===
Treaty of Yanallay
- Type: Peace treaty
- Signed: 15 November 1839
- Location: Yanallay, Peru
- Signatories: (Peru) Manuel Lopera; (Peru) Tadeo Choque
- Languages: Spanish

Finally tired of the conflict, after several confrontations, the Yanallay Treaty was signed on November 15, between the prefect of Ayacucho, Colonel Manuel Lopera, and the guerrilla Tadeo Choque (or Chocce). The Iquichans decide to recognize and submit to the Peruvian State. Huachaca refuses to participate in that agreement and retires to the Apurímac jungles, where he would later die in 1848. By 1838, the authorities used the expression republiqueta to refer to the territories under the control of Huachaca.

After the defeat of Iquicha, Huachaca changed his name to José Antonio Navala Huachaca, with José having been chosen in reference to the name of Antonio José de Sucre and his surname Navala referring to the Peruvian Navy.

== See also ==
- First Iquicha campaign
- Antonio Huachaca
- Battle of Yungay

== Bibliography ==
- Altuve-Febres Lores, Fernán (1996). Los Reinos del Perú: apuntes sobre la monarquía peruana.
- Echenique, José Rufino (1952). Memorias para la historia del Perú (1808-1878). Tomo I. Editorial Huascarán.
- Galdo Gutiérrez, Virgilio (1992). Ayacucho: conflictos y pobreza, historia regional (siglos XVI-XIX). Universidad Nacional San Cristóbal de Huamanga.
- Gavilán, Narciso (1941). Ensayos históricos. Imprenta diocesana.
- Husson, Patrick (1992). De la guerra a la rebelión: (Huanta, siglo XIX). Centro de Estudios Regionales Andinos "Bartolomé de Las Casas" & Instituto Francés de Estudios Andinos.
- Méndez Gastelumendi, Cecilia (1997). Pactos sin tributo. Caudillos y campesinos en el Perú postindependiente: el caso de Ayacucho. Siglo XXI. Coordinación de Leticia Reina. ISBN 978-968-23-2097-2.
- Méndez Gastelumendi, Cecilia (2002). "El poder del nombre, o la construcción de identidades étnicas y nacionales en el Perú: Mito e historia de los iquichanos". Documento de Trabajo. Instituto de Estudios Peruanos (IEP). ISSN 1022-0356.
- Méndez Gastelumendi, Cecilia (2005b). Tradiciones liberales en los Andes o la ciudadanía por las armas: campesinos y militares en la formación del Estado peruano. Concejo Superior de Investigaciones Científicas. Coordinación de Marta Irurozqui Victoriano. ISBN 978-8-40008-338-0.
- Sala i Vila, Nuria (2001). Selva y Andes: Ayacucho, 1780-1929, historia de una región en la encrucijada. Editorial Consejo Superior de Investigaciones Científicas (CSIC). ISBN 9788400079222.
