= Battle of Buin =

- Part of the War of the Confederation
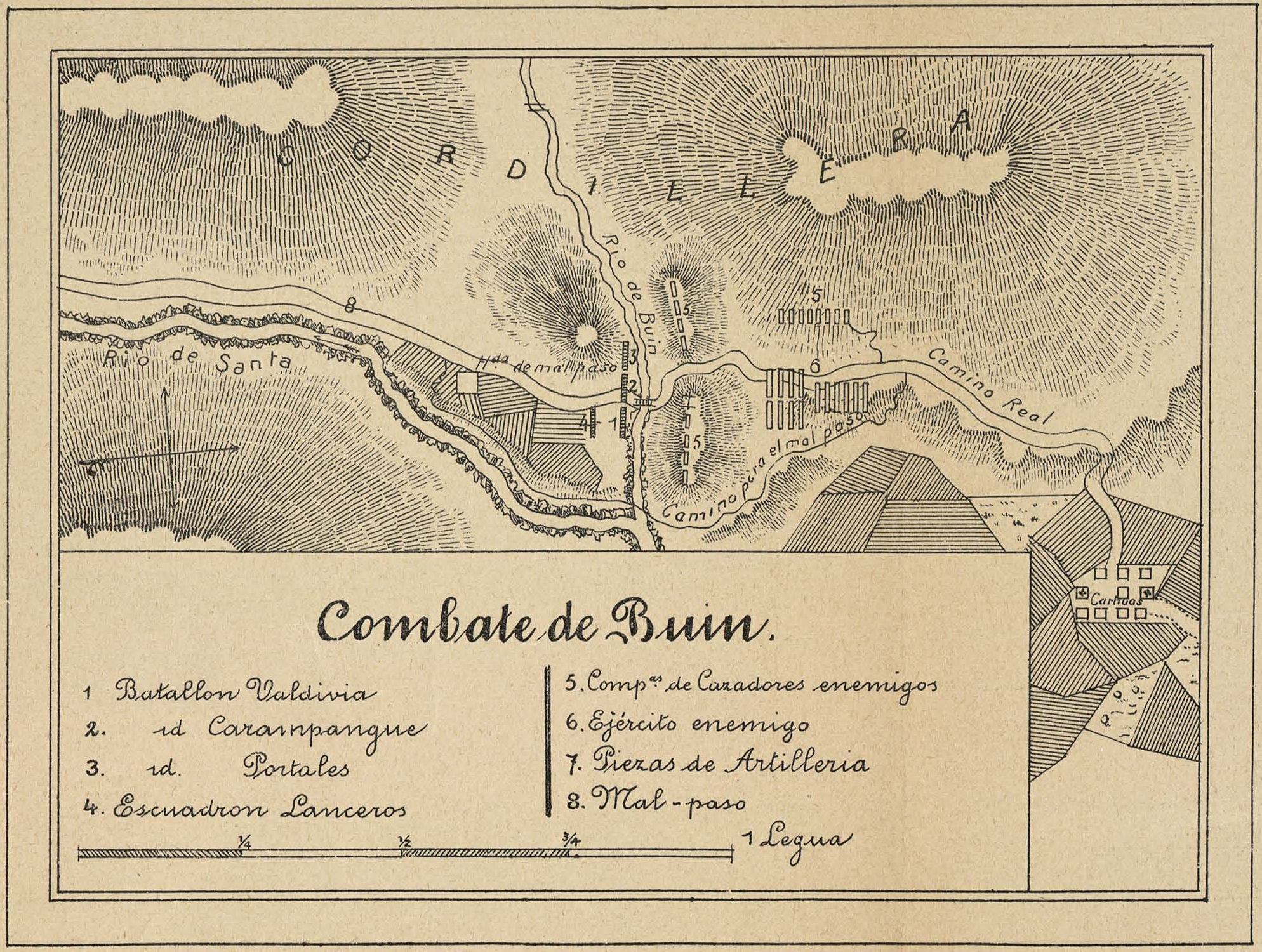
Date	January 6, 1839
Location	Buin, Huaylas province; Peru
Result	Confederation Victory

Belligerents
Chile	Peru–Bolivian Confederation

Commanders and leaders
Manuel Bulnes	A. de Santa Cruz

Strength
1,500 men: 3 infantry battalions	6,000 men: 9 infantry battalions 2 cannons

Casualties and losses
319 casualties	65 casualties

The Battle of Buin was fought on January 6, 1839, during the Chilean second expedition of the War of the Confederation. The Restoring Army rearguard led by General Manuel Bulnes successfully held the bridge over the Buin River in the North Peruvian territory from the attack of the Confederacy Army commanded by Marshal Andres de Santa Cruz, yet retreated to San Miguel leaving the field before Santa Cruz could engage him again.

Both countries consider this action as a victory. In Chile, a regiment was named "Buin" 1st Line Regiment on 1851, in commemoration of the soldiers who fought and died in this encounter. This Unit still preserves its name.

== Prologue ==
South America had been in turmoil since the War of the Confederation broke out on 1836. Chile, feeling threatened by Andres de Santa Cruz' growing influence in the continent and his intentions to create a Peru-Bolivian Confederacy, declared war on 1837. Chile sent an expedition under Manuel Blanco Encalada, but the latter failed in his task, and surrounded and outnumbered at Arequipa was forced to sign the Treaty of Paucarpata on November 17, compromising to resume trade relations with the Confederacy. This treaty was widely rejected by the Chilean government and public opinion, so a new expedition was sent, led this time by General Manuel Bulnes Prieto, a veteran from revolutionary wars during Jose Joaquin Prieto's Presidency.

== Restoring Army ==
The army assembled by Chile for the second expedition was formed by seven infantry battalions, two cavalry regiments, plus six artillery pieces; having a nominal strength of 5,400 men.

== Confederate Army ==
Santa Cruz's army was strong in about 6,000 men divided into four Corps, made up by Peruvians and Bolivians, all veterans of internal wars in their respective countries.

== Preliminary moves ==
The Restoring Army lands at Ancon on August 7, 1838. Bulnes believed that Orbegoso had abandoned the Confederacy, but the latter refused to authorize Bulnes' forces disembark. This tense situation led to a confrontation and a subsequent engagement at Portada de Guias on August 21, where Bulnes obtains his first victory in this campaign and enters in Peru's capital city. Four days later, Peruvian Marshal Agustin Gamarra is appointed as a provisional President of Peru.

This caused Santa Cruz to march over Lima. In the ensuing combat of Matucana, Bulnes results triumphant again. This setback diminishes Santa Cruz' army morale. Before these events, General Brown had defeated the bulk of the Argentinean Army at the Battle of Montenegro on June 24, 1838. On November 12, General Heredia is assassinated, ending the participation of Argentina in the war.

With the army decimated by deceases, the lack of discipline of the newly added Peruvian troops under Agustin Gamarra, and surrounded and beset by montoneros, a council decides to leave Lima on November 8. General Moran enters Lima the very next day.

The restoring plan consists in to leave Lima and move north, trying to avoid a direct confrontation with outnumbering Santa Cruz' army. Once arrived to Huacho on the 13, the sick and the wounded are sent to Trujillo and Piura, along with the poor trained Peruvian soldiers, while the rest of the army are to occupy the Huaylas Corridor, where the chances of gaining tactical advantages are stronger. During this march, a detachment of the Restoring Army under Juan Colipi contain a major confederate force at Llaclla on December 18

On January 5, Bulnes is almost surprised at Huaraz, retreating from the town but forced to detain on the northern edge of the Buin River and present battle.

== The battle ==
Since a storm broke out before the battle, the Buin became impossible to cross in any point but by the bridge over there. Thus, this bridge became the strategic goal for both armies.

=== Battle formations ===
Bulnes deployed Colonel Valenzuela's Carampangue Battalion on the centre, with Gomez' Valdivia Battalion on the right flank and Garcia's Portales Battalion on the left. The skirmishers of the first unit were to guard the bridge over the river and to keep it from falling on confederate hands

Santa Cruz formed his army over the road, with Moran's division on the rear with the rest of the army; all the skirmishers were set on a nearby height and two cannons under Colonel Pareja were aiming the bridge.

=== The beginning ===
With this positioning, the battle broke out at 15:30 hrs. When Gomez began to form his unit over the shore, Pareja opened fire upon the restoring centre. With both armies separated by the river, Santa Cruz' efforts logically focused on the bridge, but he was contained. This sector of the battlefield witnessed heavy action since the bridge was the key of victory for both sides. Also a detachment of soldiers, exhausted for the march were cut by a group of confederate troops trying to surrender them. Hence, the Portales advanced to defend them, successfully taking the company out of their difficult situation.

After an intense infantry and artillery fire, Santa Cruz ordered Moran and Guilarte to engage the enemy from different directions. General Guarda with his light division assaulted the bridge, but his column was caught by the Chilean infantry fire, falling Guarda severely wounded and forcing him to retreat. Whilst, Moran frontally charged the Carampangue Battalion, while Guilarte forwarded against Garcia's position on the restoring right flank. Then, Moran's division advanced over the bridge as well, but he was rejected too.

Around the bridge the fight was pretty vicious. A detachment from all the restoring units were defending the position under Lt. Colipi, who being surrounded charged repeatedly against their enemy. The Bolivian Captain Juan Jose Perez with a company of the Cazadores Nº 2 Battalion, threw himself with a few soldiers to the river trying to cross it, but almost all of his men drowned. Also, a few soldiers could reach the other shore under the command of Captain Leuper, but was forced to retreat, resuming the fire from both sides of the river.

The fight continued with an intense infantry cross fire, but nobody could obtain any advantages. Meanwhile, Bulnes' vanguard undid its advance trying to reach the battle in time. Vidaurre-Leal's Valparaiso Battalion was the first one to get to the battlefield, arriving on the afternoon. Fore seeking the proximity of both armies and the arrival of his vanguard would force a general battle, Bulnes ordered Valenzuela to move to the rear, and ordered Vidaurre-Leal to advance to the front line, taking the place of the Valdivia Battalion, which exhausted all of its ammunition.

The confederate army was rejected once again and forced to return to Huauyan. When the Colchagua Battalion arrived, it couldn't engage because after the confederates retreated, Lieutenant Juan Colipi destroyed the bridge, following an order existing since Huacho to destroy anything that could help the advance of the confederate army.

With the bridge cut, both armies limited to fire upon each other from their respective positions. Having his vanguard Commander injured, Santa Cruz could not take advantage of this new positioning. He also did not allow Moran to attack the restoring troops when they were crossing the creek.

Afterwards, the storm broke out again. When it stopped around 20:00 hrs, a confederate column crossed the river to scout the position, but Bulnes had already left towards San Miguel.

== Aftermath ==
Bulnes lost almost 300 men between dead and wounded, while Santa Cruz had almost 70 casualties. This battle had no decisive effects on the war development. Both commanders continued their respective plans, Bulnes moving north avoiding an engagement were the superior number of Santa Cruz' army were determinant, and Santa Cruz trying to chase down Bulnes and force him into a decisive battle. This situation continued until January 20, when at Yungay Bulnes defeated decisively the confederate army, vanquishing the Peru Bolivian Confederacy forever.

== Bibliography ==
- Gonzalo Bulnes (1878). La Campaña al Peru en 1838. Imprenta Los Tiempos.
- Crespo, Alfonso (1979). Santa Cruz, el Cóndor Indio. Librería y Editorial Juventud.
- Reyno, Manuel; Gonzalez, Edmundo (1981). Historia del Ejército de Chile, Vol III. Estado Mayor del Ejército de Chile.
