= Confederate Navy (Peru–Bolivian Confederation) =

Navy of the Peru–Bolivian Confederation

- Armada Confederada
- Leaders: José Trinidad Morán; Juan José Panizo; Juan Blanchet
- Dates active: 1836-1839
- Wars: War of the Confederation

The Confederate Navy (Spanish: Armada Confederada) was the navy of the Peru-Bolivian Confederation. It was made up by the former navies of Peru and Bolivia and its formal establishment began with the signing of the Constitution of the Confederation.

== History ==
After the victory of the alliance the armies of Luis José de Orbegoso, then constitutional president of Peru, and Andrés de Santa Cruz, then president of Bolivia, against those of Felipe Santiago Salaverry during the civil war, assemblies were soon established to make way for the creation of the Confederation, including its armed forces.

The navy was responsible for the capture of the Juan Fernández Islands on November 14, 1837. It was also serviced by privateers hired by the government.

== See also ==
- Confederate Army (Peru–Bolivian Confederation)

== Bibliography ==
- Basadre Grohmann, Jorge (2014). Historia de la República del Perú [1822-1933]. Vol. 2. El Comercio. ISBN 978-612-306-353-5.
