= Restoration (Peru) =

Overview of the history of Peru, 1821–1842

Peruvian Republic República Peruana
- 1839–1841
- Flag Coat of arms
- Motto: "Firme y feliz por la unión" (Spanish) "Firm and Happy for the Union"
- Anthem: "Himno Nacional del Perú" (Spanish) "National Anthem of Peru"
- Capital: Lima
- Common languages: Spanish
- Religion: Roman Catholicism
- Demonym(s): Peruvian
- Government: Unitary presidential republic (Note: Until elections were held in 1840, a provisional government was in place.)
- President
  - 1839–1841: Agustín Gamarra
- Legislature: National Congress
- Historical era: First Militarism
  - Battle of Yungay: 20 January 1839
  - Confederate end: 25 August 1839
  - New constitution: 10 November 1839
  - Vivanco revolts: 4 January 1841
  - Invasion of Bolivia: 1 October 1841
  - Gamarra killed: 18 November 1841
  - Interim presidency: 1841–1842
- Currency: Real
Preceded by	Succeeded by
Peru–Bolivian Confederation	Peruvian Republic

The Restoration (Spanish: Restauración), known within the context of the dissolution of the Peru–Bolivian Confederation as the Second Provisional Government (Spanish: Segundo Gobierno Provisional), was the period in Peruvian history following the reestablishment of a united Peruvian state after the War of the Confederation and prior to the period of military anarchy, lasting from 1839 to 1841.

Following the defeat of the Confederate Army at the Battle of Yungay, General Agustín Gamarra returned triumphantly to Lima on February 24, 1839 and was confirmed as provisional President. He then called the Constituent Congress in the city of Huancayo instead of Lima, as the Chilean Army was still on the eve of repatriation.

After two years, Gamarra sought to annex Bolivia to Peru through a military campaign that cost him his life at the Battle of Ingavi. He was succeeded by Manuel Menéndez, who served as constitutional president until he was overthrown by General Juan Crisóstomo Torrico, beginning a period of political instability to the point of anarchy.

== History ==
The Constituent Congress meeting in Huancayo ratified Agustín Gamarra in the Presidency, first as provisional President (August 15, 1839), while the new Constitution was sanctioned. Once this was approved, and after popular elections, Gamarra was proclaimed Constitutional President (July 10, 1840).

During this second government, Gamarra followed the same guidelines as the first, being authoritarian and conservative, as circumstances demanded, after several years of civil war. He faced the challenge of pacifying the country, having to face the “regenerative” revolution that Manuel Ignacio de Vivanco led in Arequipa, proclaiming himself Supreme Chief (1841). The Minister of War Ramón Castilla was sent to combat it, who after suffering defeat in Cachamarca, triumphed over the Vivanquistas in Cuevillas. Vivanco fled to Bolivia.

=== Important works and events ===
- He convened the Constituent Congress of Huancayo, which was installed on August 15, 1839 and then promulgated a Conservative Constitution on November 10 of that year, which would govern the country until 1854. Compared to the previous liberal Constitutions of 1823, 1828 and 1834, that weakened the authority of the Executive Branch by attempting to subordinate it to the Legislative Branch, the Constitution of Huancayo was intended to strengthen the authority of the Executive. It increased the presidential term to 6 years and abolished the municipal regime.
- In 1839 steam navigation began on the coasts of Peru. The North American shipowner William Wheelwright–agent of the Pacific Steam Navigation Company–had the happy idea of implementing this type of navigation on the coasts of the South Pacific, initially counting on the ships called Peru and Chile. The implementation of this system streamlined cargo and passenger transportation operations, which until then were carried out with sailing ships, whose slow movement was subject, in most cases, to the whims of nature.
- On May 4, 1839, the newspaper El Comercio began its publication in Lima, founded by the Chilean Manuel Amunátegui and his partner Alejandro Villota, with the motto “Order, freedom, knowledge”, a newspaper that remains to this day.
- On November 14, 1840, the College of Our Lady of Guadalupe was founded, its promoters being Domingo Elías, a merchant and farmer from Ica and the Spaniard Nicolás Rodrigo, in view of the great shortage of educational centers in Lima. It was founded to provide education to children but soon extended its action to young people and even provided higher education.
- Thanks to the rebirth of confidence in the stability of the State, the first contract to exploit guano deposits and promote their sale in foreign markets was formalized in Lima (November 10, 1840). The Peruvian businessman Francisco Quirós obtained the privilege of exploiting the guano deposits for six years, and was obliged to pay a fee of 10,000 pesos annually. Later it was changed to the so-called “consignment regime”.
- On July 8, 1841, the "Treaty of Peace, Friendship, Commerce and Navigation" was signed in Lima between diplomatic representatives Duarte da Ponte Ribeiro of Brazil and Manuel B. Ferreyros of Peru. Aside from the agreements that were made for the qualification of the commercial vessels of both countries, as well as the way in which the corresponding transactions should be carried out, it was agreed regarding limits "to carry it out as soon as possible according to the uti possidetis of 1821", with the commitment to make territorial changes or compensations, according to what was agreed between the parties. The next day a Postal Convention was signed, with the participation of the same diplomats.
- During this time, the costumbrista movement in Peruvian literature flourished, with Felipe Pardo y Aliaga and Manuel Ascencio Segura as its greatest exponents. Pardo satirized the political and social customs of the time, mocking his enemies, the liberals, and Segura satirized the customs of the middle class and the military leadership. Pancho Fierro excelled in traditional painting.

=== Invasion of Bolivia ===
Gamarra began a new war against Bolivia, whose purpose was to reunite it with Peru, or at least incorporate only the department of La Paz. To justify himself, he argued a series of reasons, such as the fact that the supporters of Andrés de Santa Cruz, who at that time was exiled in Ecuador, were still operating in Bolivia. Once war was declared, the Peruvian army stationed in Puno invaded Bolivia, advancing through Huancané, Moho and Sorata, and on October 19, 1841, it occupied La Paz, where it camped. The Bolivians put aside their political quarrels and gathered around General José Ballivián. On November 18, 1841, both armies met on the Ingavi plain, east of La Paz. It is said that Gamarra, upon seeing that the colors of the rainbow stood out in the sky, said in a foreboding tone: "If I were Roman I would postpone the battle, because I see the colors of Bolivia reflected in the sky." But he ordered the attack, and shortly after the fight began he fell mortally wounded. The battle ended with the defeat of the Peruvians, after fifty minutes of fierce fighting.

Gamarra's remains were transported from Bolivia to Lima in 1849 with great solemnity and buried in the Presbítero Maestro Cemetery. On the occasion of the funeral of this leader, Bartolomé Herrera gave a famous sermon, which was a call to order in the country.

With Gamarra dead, Bolivian troops occupied southern Peru, but after they were expelled by the Peruvian Army, the Treaty of Puno was signed between both countries on June 7, 1842, officially ending the war. Gamarra was succeeded by Manuel Menéndez, who served as constitutional president until he was overthrown by General Juan Crisóstomo Torrico, beginning a period of military anarchy.

== See also ==
- History of Peru (1821–1842)
