= Confederate Army (Peru–Bolivian Confederation) =

Army of the Peru–Bolivian Confederation

- Ejército Confederado
- Leader: Andrés de Santa Cruz
- Dates active: 1836-1839
- Wars: War of the Confederation; Tarija War; Iquicha War

The Confederate Army (Spanish: Ejército Confederado), preceded in 1835 by the United Army (Spanish: Ejército Unido), was the land army of the Peru-Bolivian Confederation. It was made up by the former armies of Peru and Bolivia and its formal establishment began with the signing of the Constitution of the Confederation.

== History ==
The army was preceded by an alliance between Peruvian troops loyal to Luis José de Orbegoso, then constitutional president of Peru, and the Bolivian Army of ally and president of Bolivia, Andrés de Santa Cruz, who crossed the border into Peru at Orbegoso's invitation during the civil war that broke out after political instability and a coup d'état in 1835 by Felipe Santiago Salaverry. After the alliance's triumph in 1836, assemblies were soon established to make way for the creation of the Confederation, including its army.

The army initially saw success against the first military expedition carried out by Peruvian dissidents in Arequipa, forcing them to sign a peace treaty, but was ultimately defeated in the second expedition's Battle of Yungay, which ended the War of the Confederation, and was thus dissolved alongside the Confederation. It had also been involved in a conflict against the Argentine Confederation in the Tarija War since 1837.

== See also ==
- Confederate Navy (Peru–Bolivian Confederation)

== Bibliography ==
- Basadre Grohmann, Jorge (2014). Historia de la República del Perú [1822-1933]. Vol. 2. El Comercio. ISBN 978-612-306-353-5.
