= Juan Antonio González =

Juan Antonio González may refer to:

- Juan Antonio González Ibieta (1834–1904), Chilean politician
- Juan Antonio González Iglesias (born 1964), Spanish poet
- Juan Antonio González Ureña (born 1967), Spanish footballer
- Juan Antonio González Crespo (born 1972), Uruguayan footballer
- Juan Antonio Gonzalez Fernandez, also known as Juanan (born 1987), Spanish footballer
- Juan Antonio Simarro González (born 1973), Spanish composer, interpreter and producer

== See also ==
- Gonzalez (surname)
