= Firm and Happy for the Union =

Motto on Peruvian currency

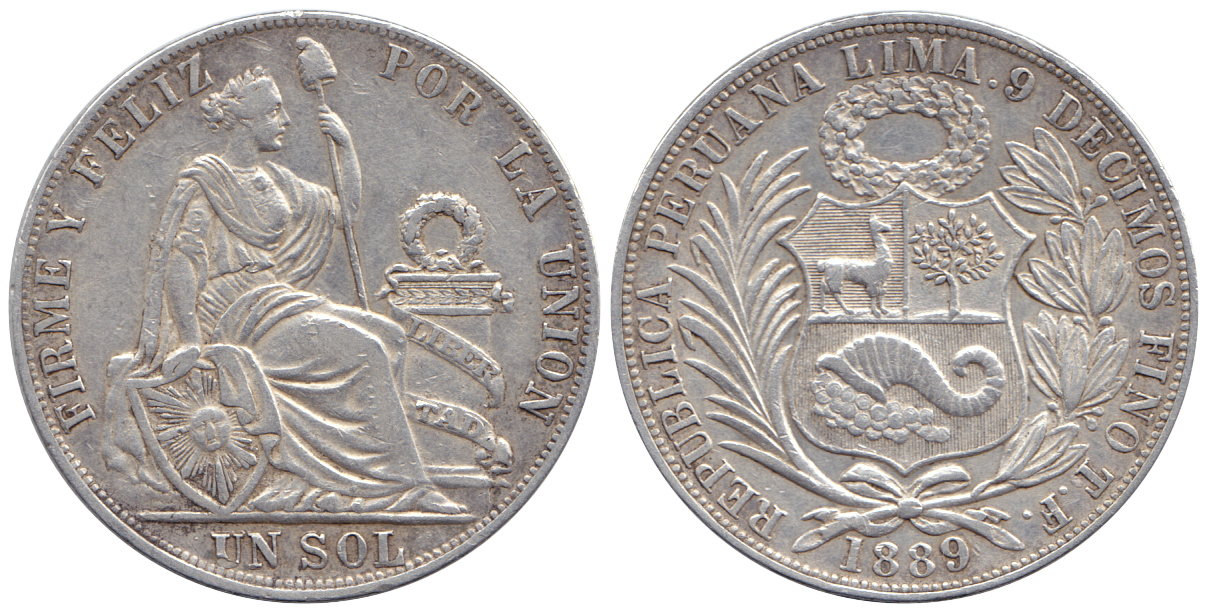
1889 silver coin engraved with Firme y feliz por la unión

Firm and Happy for the Union (Spanish: Firme y feliz por la unión) is a motto mentioned on Peruvian currency. It first appeared on the gold 8 escudos coin in 1826 and in copper and nickel on the 8 reales coin in 1825. It was on all the currencies depicting a silver sun, from the first minted in 1863.
