= Felipe Pardo y Aliaga =

Writer, diplomat and politician

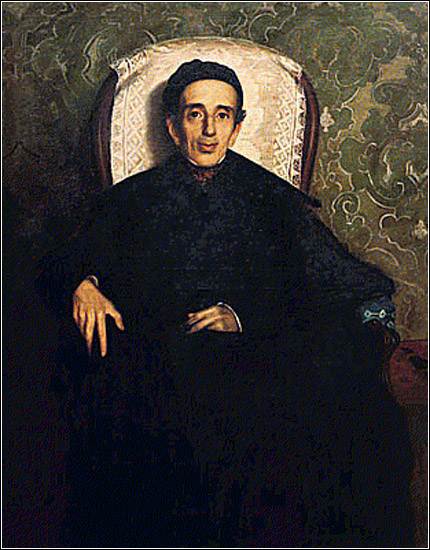
Felipe Pardo y Aliaga. Portrait by Francisco Laso

Felipe Pardo y Aliaga (11 June 1806, Lima – 24 December 1868, Lima) was a Peruvian poet, satirist, playwright, lawyer and politician.

== Biography ==
A member of Lima's aristocratic elite, his father was Manuel Pardo Ribadeneira, oidor of the Real Audiencia of Lima, and his mother was Mariana de Aliaga y Borda, daughter of the 2nd Marquise of Fuente Hermosa de Miranda.

He was, along with Manuel Ascencio Segura, the most important representative of early Republican Peruvian literature. After independence he participated in political affairs, defending conservative causes. He became a diplomat, representing Peru in Chile and a minister in the cabinet of presidents Felipe Santiago Salaverry, Manuel Ignacio de Vivanco and Ramón Castilla.

Pardo married Petronila de Lavalle y Cabrero, daughter of the 2nd Count of Premio Real. He was father of Manuel Justo Pardo Lavalle and grandfather of José Pardo y Barreda, presidents of the Republic.

== Works ==
=== Essays and travelogues ===
- Un viaje 1840 "El viaje del niño Goyito"

=== Poetry ===
- El carnaval de Lima, 1929
- La jeta del guerrero, 1925
- La nariz
- Los paraísos de Sempronio
- El ministro y el aspirante
- A mi levita
- Qué guapos chicos
- Corrida de toros
- La lámpara, 1844
- A mi hijo en sus días, 1855
- Vaya una República, 1856
- El Perú, 1856
- Constitución política, 1859

=== Plays ===
- Frutos de la educación, 1830
- Una huérfana en Chorrillos, 1833
- Don Leocadio y el aniversario de Ayacucho, 1833
