= Antonio Gutiérrez de la Fuente =

President of Peru (1796–1878)

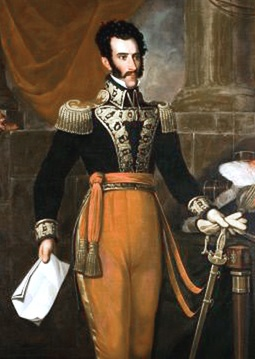
- Portrait by Francis Martin Drexel, c. 1828–1829

Interim President of Peru
- In office June 7, 1829 – September 1, 1829
- Preceded by: José de La Mar (as Constitutional President)
- Succeeded by: Agustín Gamarra (as Constitutional President)

3rd Vice President of Peru
- In office September 1, 1829 – April 16, 1831
- President: Agustín Gamarra
- Preceded by: Vacant (Last held by Manuel Salazar y Baquíjano)
- Succeeded by: Vacant (Office abolished - Juan Manuel del Mar Bernedo elected in 1858)

Mayor of Lima
- In office January 8, 1868 – March 27, 1869
- Preceded by: Antonio Salinas y Castañeda
- Succeeded by: José María de la Puente y Oyague
- In office March 18, 1863 – January 8, 1866
- Preceded by: Miguel Pardo Iraola
- Succeeded by: Antonio Salinas y Castañeda

Member of the Chamber of Deputies
- In office August 31, 1829 – December 20, 1829
- Constituency: Chuquibamba, Arequipa

Personal details
- Born: September 8, 1796 Huantajaya, Tarapacá, Viceroyalty of Peru
- Died: March 14, 1878 (aged 81) Lima, Peru
- Profession: Soldier

Antonio Gutiérrez de la Fuente (September 8, 1796 – March 14, 1878) was a Peruvian politician who also served in the Peruvian military. He briefly served as President of Peru from June 7 to September 1, 1829.

Gutiérrez de la Fuente was born in the silver-mining town of Huantajaya, Tarapacá, Peru (now Chile), in 1796. He was an officer in the Spanish forces, before joining the rebellion for independence. Strong partisan of Simón Bolívar they supported the 1823 coup.

De la Fuente and Agustín Gamarra were made governors of southern States after Peruvian independence, with de la Fuente in charge of Arequipa. In 1826 they considered separating from Peru, but instead lead the movement to overthrow the government of José de La Mar with de la Fuente being named Vice President of Peru and taking the position of the President of the Republic until the General Agustín Gamarra succeeded him. Gutiérrez de la Fuente served as the Vice President of Peru from September 1, 1829 to April 16, 1831.

He served as the President of the Senate in 1849 and from 1851 to 1853.

He died in Lima in 1878.

Political offices
| Preceded by José de La Mar | President of Peru; 1829 | Succeeded by Agustín Gamarra |
