= Felipe Santiago Salaverry =

President of Peru from 1835 to 1836

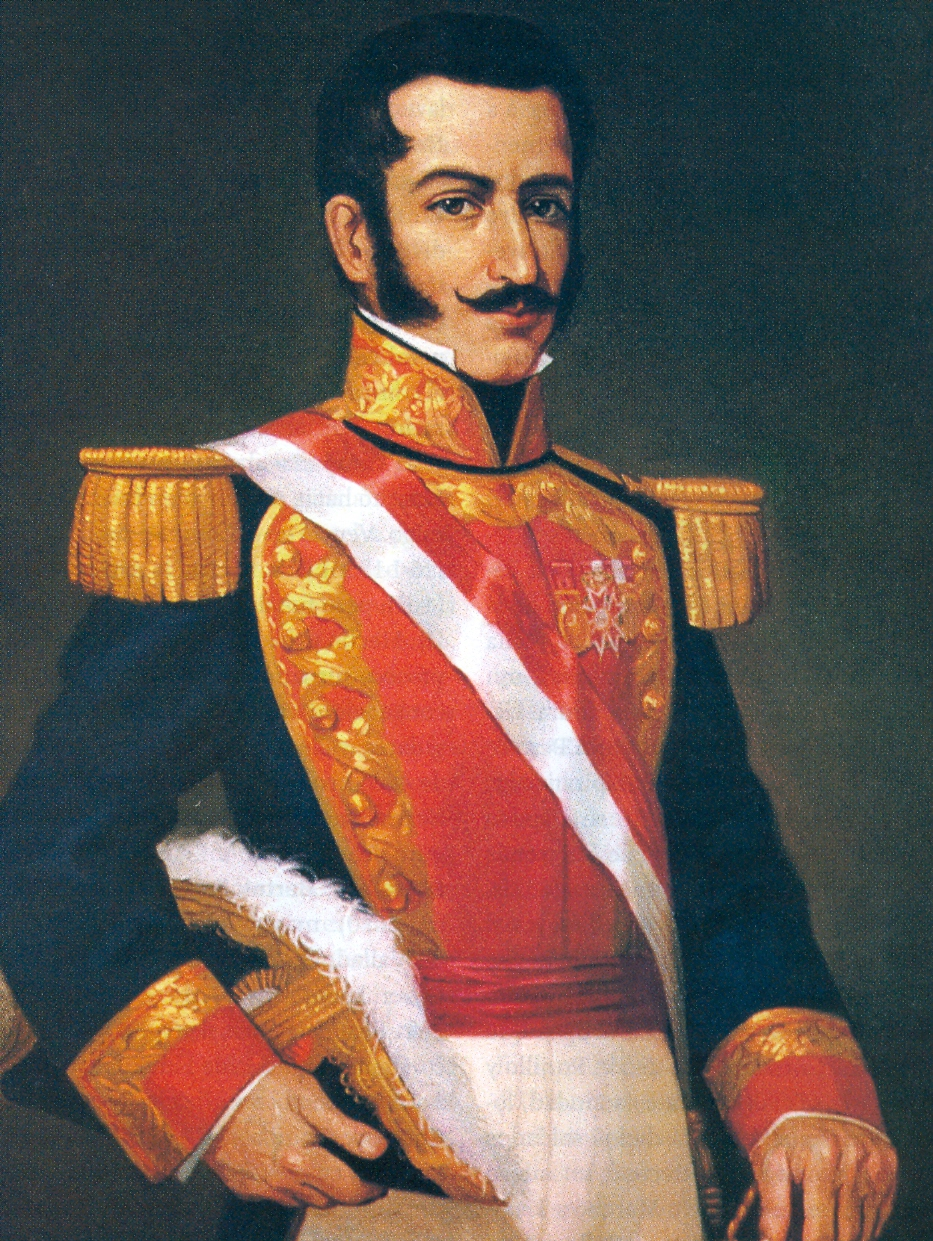

Supreme Chief of the Peruvian Republic
- In office 25 February 1835 – 7 February 1836
- Preceded by: Luis José de Orbegoso as President of Peru
- Succeeded by: Andrés de Santa Cruz as President of the Confederation

Personal details
- Born: May 3, 1806 Lima, Viceroyalty of Peru
- Died: February 18, 1836 (aged 29) Arequipa, Peru
- Spouse: Juana Pérez Palza de Infantas
- Children: Carlos Augusto Salaverry Ramírez; Felipe Augusto Salaverry Pérez

Felipe Santiago Salaverry del Solar (1805 – February 18, 1836) was a Peruvian soldier and politician who served as the Supreme Chief of Peru. He supported anti-liberalism.

== Biography ==
Salaverry was born in 1805 in Lima and studied in the College of San Carlos in Lima. When José de San Martín arrived in Peru in 1820, Salaverry left college despite his father's opposition, and made his way to Huaura Province, where he volunteered to join the general and his forces. San Martin enlisted Salaverry as a cadet of the battalion of Numancia, a campaign against the Spaniards. He led the Peruvian Cavalry at the battles of Junin and Ayacucho, helping secure the Independence of Peru and routing the Spanish Army. After the establishment of the republic of Peru, Salaverry rose rapidly in the army. At the age of twenty-eight, Salaverry obtained the rank of General Inspector of the Peruvian Army.

When the garrison of Callao revolted in January 1835, against then President Luis Orbegoso, and pronounced in favor of La Fuente, Salaverry defeated the insurgents. Orbegoso appointed him governor of the fortress. But on February 23, Salaverry rose in arms against the government. After Orbegoso abandoned Lima, Salaverry occupied the capital and proclaimed himself "Supreme Chief of the Republic" on 25 February. In a few months he had possession of the south, and Orbegoso retreated with a small force to the northern provinces.

A decree of Felipe Santiago Salaverry re-legalizes the importation of slaves from other Latin American countries. The line "no slave shall enter Peru without becoming free" is taken out of the Constitution in 1839.

He fought the intervention of Andrés Santa Cruz, leader of Bolivia, with whom Orbegoso concluded a treaty giving Santa Cruz a third of Peru. Soon after, the Bolivian army invaded Peru, and Salaverry retreated to the city of Arequipa. Salaverry obtained victories at the battle of Uchumayo, February 4, 1836, but on February 7, his forces were totally routed in Socabaya, a district of the city.

After wandering for several days in his way to join the Peruvian Navy stationed at the coast at Islay in Arequipa, Salaverry was finally captured by General Miller, who delivered him to Santa Cruz, who ordered the execution of Salaverry and his General Staff. He died in Arequipa on February 19, 1836. Salaverry's field jacket, the one he wore when he was executed, is today shown at the Peruvian Museum of Gold at Monterrico.

== See also ==
- List of presidents of Peru

Political offices
Preceded by Luis José de Orbegoso y Moncada	President of Peru; 1835–1836	Succeeded by Andrés de Santa Cruz
