= Antonio Huachaca =

18/19th-century Peruvian Royalist politician and military leader

José Antonio Navala Huachaca
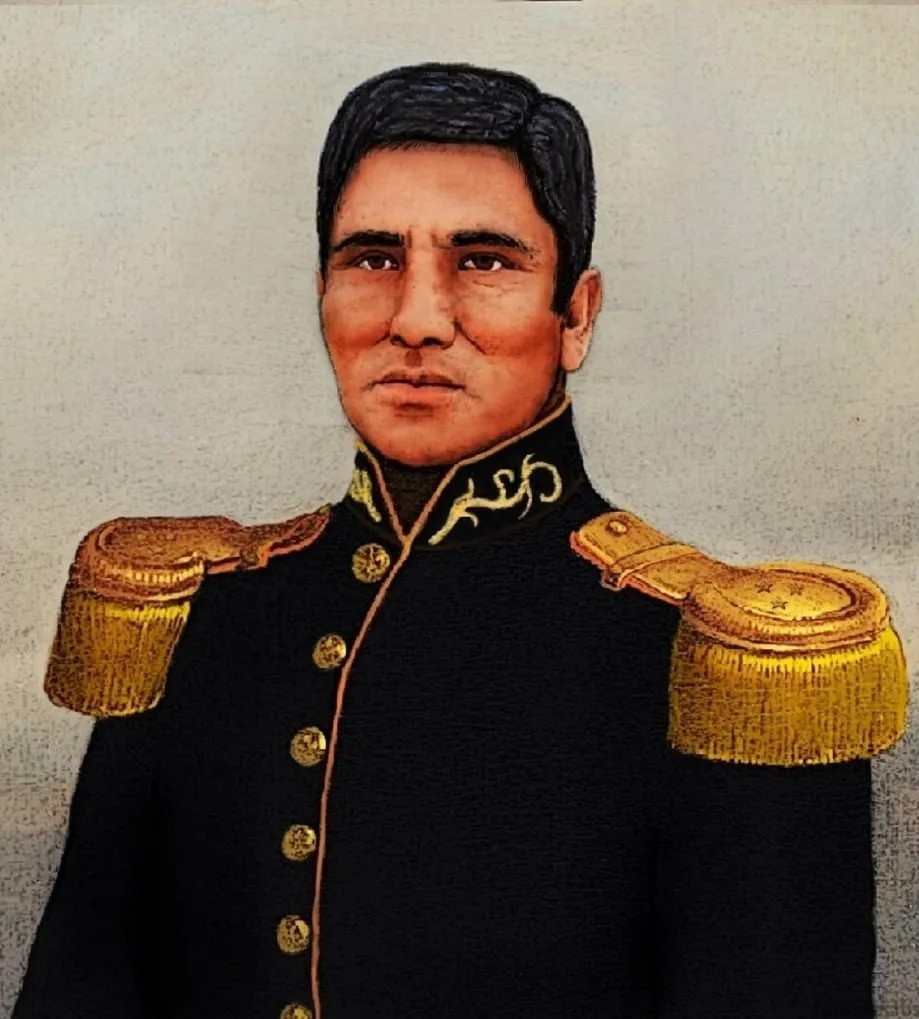

Supreme Protector of the Peru–Bolivian Confederation (Territorial control over the State of Iquicha) Supreme Chief of the Confederation in Iquicha
- In office March 1839 – 10 November 1839
- Preceded by: Andrés de Santa Cruz (as Supreme Protector of the Peru-Bolivian Confederation)
- Succeeded by: Tadeo Choque

Supreme Chief of the Republic of Iquicha
- In office 1822–1836
- Preceded by: Position established
- Succeeded by: Position abolished Himself (as Justice of the Peace and Governor of Carhuaucran District)

Justice of the Peace and Governor of Carhuaucran District
- In office 1836 – August 25, 1839
- Preceded by: Position established Himself (as Supreme Chief of the Republic of Iquicha)
- Succeeded by: Position abolished

Personal details
- Born: Antonio Huachaca (Note: Also written as Guachaca.) San José de Iquicha, (Note: Named by the Spanish as San José de Santillana and today known as San José de Secce. The name San José de Iquicha comes from the local quechua name for the region, Iquicha.) Peru
- Died: 1848 Apurímac, Peru
- Occupation: Muleteer; Brigadier general
- Nickname: Great Chief of the Restorative Division of the Law

Military service
- Allegiance: Spain (1814–1839); Peru (1834); Peru-Bolivian Confederation (1836–1839)
- Years of service: 1814–1839
- Rank: Brigadier general
- Battles/wars: Cuzco Rebellion of 1814; Peruvian War of Independence; Iquicha War of 1825–1828; Battle of Huanta; Peruvian Civil War of 1834; Peruvian Civil War of 1835–1836; War of the Confederation; Iquicha War of 1839

Antonio Huachaca was a Peruvian indigenous peasant and loyalist of the Spanish Empire who fought for Spain during the Viceregal era, and then for the Royalist cause during and after the Peruvian War of Independence, reaching the rank of brigadier general of the Royal Army of Peru. He later took part in establishing the Peru–Bolivian Confederation, eventually holding the title of "Justice of the Peace and Governor of Carhuaucran District" until the Confederation's dissolution in 1839.

After the defeat of Iquicha, Huachaca changed his name to José Antonio Navala Huachaca, with José having been chosen in reference to the name of Antonio José de Sucre and his surname Navala referring to the Peruvian Navy. Finally, after the defeat of his armies, he continued his guerrilla warfare until 1839.

== Early life ==
Huachaca was born to an indigenous family on an unknown date in San José de Santillana, known also as San José de Iquicha, at the end of the 18th century. He had at least two brothers: Prudencio and Pedro, who fought with him in his first rebellion. Prudencio died in 1827, and Pedro in 1828. It is possible that while he was still a child, Túpac Amaru II was executed in 1781. He grew up as an illiterate muleteer and no estate, being part of the peasants of the community. His carriage routes, commercial networks, and extensive kinship relationships allowed him to associate with landless farmers living in the jungle, villagers, and locals in Huanta.

By 1813 he is already as a very popular leader, leading the indigenous peasants in defiance of the orders of the Huamanga administration in protest of the inability of the local mayor to stop the abuses of government tax collectors, since the Cadiz Constitution had abolished indigenous tribute and non-salaried work in public works (minka). This was a direct consequence of the revolt that had affected the city of Huamanga the previous year, the promulgation of the liberal constitution and the conflicts of the liberal revolutionaries with the absolutist viceregal authorities. The Iquichan locals had no problem supporting both an absolutist king and the reforms of a liberal constitution since both benefitted them. However, in the face of the insurrection that soon broke out in Cuzco, Huachaca and his people decided to support the king's representatives, indicating that the disrespect for ordinances was more a reaction against a concrete abuse than a movement inspired by some ideology.

=== Military career ===
He began his military career facing the insurrectionists from Cuzco, mobilizing against the Angulo brothers, just as they had done in 1780 against Túpac Amaru II. The fighting between the Huantinos and Cusqueños took place from late 1814 to early 1815, with Huachaca acting as guerrilla chief under the command of the landowner and militia commander, Pedro José Lazón, and receiving the rank of brigadier general for these actions in the Royal Army from José de la Serna. The main action in which the Iquichans participated at that time was the successful defense of Huanta, on October 1, 1814, when a column of 5000 Morochucos (only 300 of them armed with rifles) with four cannons and cavalry tried to take the city. Unlike the Iquichans, prominent royalists, the Morochucos from Cangallo distinguished themselves as fierce patriots.

=== Later guerrilla movements ===
The guerrilla uprising in Huamanga was not the only one, but nevertheless the most successful one. As the republican armies advanced, guerrillas favorable to one side or the other began to emerge. Many pro-independence parties had managed to surround Lima while José de San Martín occupied Huara and Ica. A series of very successful military operations coordinated between soldiers and montoneros began to be launched. Pío de Tristán launched a series of campaigns to the highlands with the support of guerrillas from Huamanga and when José de Canterac approached Callao, his forces were constantly harassed.

Among the commanders, patriot Cayetano Quirós, leader of a guerrilla of 200 Morochucos in Ica, stands out; He also managed to act in Cangallo, Jauja and Huancayo in aid of the dispersed forces of the Liberating Expedition. He is later defeated and shot in May 1822, with Ica becoming a royalist stronghold for another three years.

In the second half of 1826, patriot José de la Riva-Agüero recruited 3,000 guerrillas scattered in Huarochirí, Yauyos, Yauli, Jauja and Tarma for the division of General José de La Mar, while Andrés de Santa Cruz drafted 2,000 men in Jauja, Huancayo and Huancavelica.

In this way, the main fields of confrontations and operations between montoneros were the municipalities of Huamanga, Huancavelica and Ica. During 1823, while the quite devastating advance of the United Liberation Army of Peru began in numerous cities and towns of the Peruvian central highlands, irregular units were organized that began to act as guerrillas, informants and even reinforcements of the Royal Army, greatly diminished by the long war. The monarchical resistance in central and southern Peru ended with the defeat of Viceroy De La Serna in Ayacucho on December 9, 1824.

== Rebellion of San José de Santillana ==
Huachaca was accompanied by other leaders, all of them indigenous with the exception of the Frenchman Nicolás Soregui, a merchant and former officer of the Spanish Army in Peru. (Note: Soregui was reportedly joined in a moment of despair over an infidelity by his wife.) They are described as a very disciplined force despite being armed mainly with slings and spears due to the shortage of rifles. Although most of them were armed with sticks, stones and sticks, there were those who had rifles and units on horseback, even those who wore uniforms.

Huanta was once again surrounded and taken, with most rebels coming from the district of Iquicha in Ayacucho. They were merchants or muleteers, and there was also indirect participation by Spaniards and mestizos, who helped with organization and propaganda. The monarchy had created a mystified version of the figure of the Catholic King or Inca among the population. He was seen as an envoy of God, defender of his worldview of the world, his religiosity and traditional way of life; the vassal relationship with his lord was therefore sacred. Therefore, the republic was considered by the Andean people as the enemy of their people and their faith. The intendancy was populated mainly by Indians, except for the homonymous capital and the surrounding area. The first sign of rebellion came when the rebels executed Lieutenant Colonel Celedonio Medina in Guano, who was taking Bolívar's report to Lima reporting the victory in Ayacucho in early December 1824.

The first phase of the rebellion occurred between March and December 1825 when the indigenous people of Iquicha mobilized, but were quickly contained by the patriot army that was in Huanta. Peace would be very short, however. In January 1826 another mobilization took place that also protested against the collection of the coca tithe. (Note: The Ayacucho region and, especially that of Huanta, lived off the coca trade. The rebels also came to organize their own tithe on peasant production to finance the rebellion.) This assured them a relatively good economic position.

In June 1826, the rebels under the command of Huachaca and Soregui managed to seize the town of Huanta, turning it into a center of operations. The small republican garrison fled and when the Iquichanos arrived, they simply entered the town and set fire to the barracks, the municipality and other buildings. Later, and with the support of two deserting factions of the Húsares de Junín, they tried to take Huamanga, but were defeated by the garrison of the city. The city was defended by eight trenches with one cannon each. When the rebels withdrew from Huanta, Huachaca he ordered the town to be burned, but no one complied with that order. In July 1826, the general and president of the Governing Council, Andrés de Santa Cruz, personally traveled to Ayacucho to fight the rebels. As a consequence of these events, a fierce campaign of repression against the rebels began; Frequent were the executions of those who refused to pay taxes to the authorities, the humiliation of women, the execution of prisoners and the desecration of churches by the so-called peacekeepers or republican troops.

The third phase of the rebellion began on November 12, 1827, when the rebels from Iquicha retake Huanta, after a weak resistance from the Pichincha battalion under the command of the elusive Sergeant Major Narciso Tudela. (Note: The garrison numbered just over 150 soldiers; The military barracks were set on fire and the soldiers took refuge in the temples.) The Iquichans were led by Huachaca, and by the commanders of the guerrilla forces, among whom stood out (his brother) Prudencio Huachaca, the French Basque Nicolás Soregui, Francisco Garay, Francisco Lanche, Tadeo Chocce and the priest Mariano Meneses, chaplain of the Iquichan army. Tadeo Chocce (Note: Also written as Choque.) was a literate Indian with a farm in the puna. On the heights of Iquicha the monarchical banner had once again risen, and his plans were very ambitious: to take Huanta, liberate Huamanga and Huancavelica and, finally, the "Restoration of the Kingdom", extirpating the republicans, proclaiming a counterrevolutionary and illiberal ideology, supported by clergymen.

Keeping the city under his control for two weeks, Huachaca is appointed by locals as "Great Chief of the Restorative Division of the Law", a troop of around 3000 community members. Then, hoisting the Cross of Burgundy and shouting "Long live the King!", The Iquichans again attacked Ayacucho in numbers from 1500 to 4000, but they are defeated a second time by the skilful defense of the prefect Domingo Tristán y Moscoso in the battles of Mollepata hill and Honda ravine (November 29 and 30, respectively). (Note: "The whites most cruel towards the Indians are executed. Numerous Morochucos from Huamanga and Cangallo participated in the defense.") This defeat would mark the end of the movement. In December they lose Huanta again. Until June 1828, all the leaders with the exception of Huachaca were arrested. In December of the same year, Soregui and three other leaders are sentenced to death. After overcoming the resistance of the guerrillas, they massacred the indigenous people of Huanta without discrimination of any kind and shot the prisoners without prior trial. Two years later and before the appeal presented by the accused, the Superior Court of Justice of Cusco annulled all the death sentences and Soregui is exiled for ten years along with other leaders.

After the fall of Huanta, the irregular phase of the campaign began, known as the guerrilla phase or phase of the castles of Iquicha, named as such due to the Andean peaks having served as fortresses for the monarchical resistance of the indigenous peasantry. Colonel Vidal organized a campaign of counter-henchmen to repress and exterminate the "fanatics" who upheld tradition as the ancestral right to self-determination. For this he took the last 150 regular soldiers who still remained in Huamanga.

The most notable event of this stage was the Battle of Uchuraccay of August 25, 1828, where Commander Gabriel Quintanilla—commanding the well-armed civilian men—faced the courageous Iquichans equipped only with lances and slings for a period of two hours. In this combat, Prudencio Huachaca, and Sergeant Major Pedro Cárdenas, among others, were killed, and the capitulated Valle was also wounded, who died a few days later. Hundreds of Iquichans died and his general had to flee to the mountains on the back of his horse, Rifle. The militias, without a leader, could briefly put up some resistance. The combat was bloody and little known. It symbolized "the time when that piece of [the Iquichan] homeland absurdly and fiercely resisted separating from Spain." Not having been able to capture General Huachaca, the victors took his wife and two of his sons, the so-called cadets, who were taken as prisoners and sent to Ayacucho. As in the case of the Túpac Amaru rebellion, the subjugation of the Iquichanos was characterized by the numerous massacres perpetrated. Shortly after, the last combat against the government forces took place in Cano: seven bloody months had passed and the republicans had managed to control the indigenous forces. Sorequi, Garay, Ramos, Father Pacheco and priest Meneses had been captured. All except for Huachaca.

== Civil wars ==
Huachaca went on to live in hiding, without leaving his rebellious attitude. He is detected in 1830 near Huanta and Carhuahurán, again with a threatening attitude. From then on, a reward of $2,000 for his head and that of Mariano Méndez. The Iquichan community members would remain unruly during this time, supporting various leaders. In 1834 they sided with the liberal president Luis José de Orbegoso y Moncada against the conservative Agustín Gamarra, based in Cuzco. The differences between the main political groups were blurred and the caudillos constantly shifted positions as the proposals of the factions changed over time. The nineteenth-century struggles are based on the confrontation of the centralist conservatives, strong in Lima and on the northern coast, although during Gamarra's life they had an important presence in Cuzco, against federalist liberals, with a presence in the southern Andean mountains and especially in Arequipa. although with many supporters in Lima. It should be mentioned that during the decades following Bolivian independence, maritime trade flourished and Cuzco was displaced by Arequipa as the economic center of southern Peru.

On January 3 there was a conservative coup against the liberal government, proclaiming Pedro Pablo Bermúdez Supreme Ruler of Peru, but immediately violent street protests broke out in Lima, forcing the coup plotters to leave the capital and take refuge in the country's interior. On the same day Orbegoso left his refuge in the Real Felipe Fortress and entered Lima victorious.

Gamarra entrenched himself in the interior of the country, counting on the support of the prefects of Puno, Cuzco, Ayacucho and some in the north, as well as most of the army officers. Orbegoso had the support of the civilian population through the support of the popular generals William Miller and Mariano Necochea. After several successes at the head of their montoneras, the Orbegosista generals sought to ally themselves with the inhabitants of Huanta, treating them with deference despite the disdain that the majority felt for the local peasants. This movement would be joined by many men from the city who had not participated, openly at least, in the rebellion of 1825–1828.

In alliance with Orbegoso, the Huanta notables armed 4,000 Indians under the command of the landowner and captain of the local civic militias Juan José Urbina, who had contributed $519 of the $3,262 it cost to mobilize an army larger than that of the monarchical rebellion. Other means of payment had been the indebtedness under promise that the Orbegoso government would pay after its triumph and the appropriation of the ecclesiastical tithes. Urbina had been alderman of the city in 1826 and during the rebellion he was apparently loyal to the Republic, however, he enjoyed strong support among the entire monarchical population. He cleverly managed to unify under his command, and through two "acts", the "montoneros de las punas" and the notables of the region, making them forget their ideological, social or ethnic differences for a time. He had been named by Huachaca, Choque and Mendéz "Commander General of the Army" in Uchuraccay on March 8; two days later municipal authorities and "notable neighbors" of Huanta met in Luricocha and recognized him as "Commander in Chief." Of the latter group, the majority had not supported, openly at least, the royalist rebellion of 1825–1828. During the civil war, General Domingo Tristán, the new prefect of Ayacucho, who a few years ago had violently repressed the Iquichanos in that rebellion—in fact, he despised them—now wrote proclamations to encourage them to fight on his behalf. He asked Miller for help, who was familiar with the montoneros of Huanta despite having fought against them, and through personal letters asked Huachaca to fight against Gamarra and Bermúdez. (Note: In a letter dated March 4, 1834, dated Lunahuaná, he claimed that Gamarra and Bermúdez threatened the peace of the province with four to five thousand men.)

Guerrilla operations began immediately against the pro-Gamarra garrisons that occupied Huamanga and Huanta in the middle of the month, taking advantage of the absence of the prefect, General José María Frías y Lastra, the Tiger of Piura, to evict them. The two defeats given to Gamarra were decisive, and in May the civil war ended with the victory of the Orbegosistas, after the battle of Huaylacucho on April 17. During the conflict, Urbina's army carried out operations outside the province of Huanta, in Huamanga and Huancavelica. At the end of the year, Orbegoso, already president, traveled to Huanta. During his visit he was entertained with celebrations by the city's "notables", however, when he wanted to meet with Huachaca they informed him that he had left. The president regretted it and affirmed that he promised to educate one of the caudillo's children (on the other hand, in 1831, when Gamarra visited the city, the municipal authorities refused to receive him and they were considered acts of "civil disobedience"). Modern historians affirm that Orbegoso wanted to establish a client-type relationship with Huachaca, but the latter did not want to. Finally, he promised to educate one of his children to gain his loyalty, since he could not offer a semi-illiterate and Quechua-speaking muleteer a high position in the public administration or the army. The offer entered into the logic of the hierarchical relations of Peruvian society and to a certain extent insulting, since it meant that Huachaca could not educate his descendants well. The truth is that the majority of the Hispano-American intelligentsia (except for the Cuzco one) kept the hope of being able to symbolically whiten the lower strata of the population of their countries through education, the press and civilizing literature. As for Urbina, a notable and wealthy neighbor, in October he was appointed attorney-in-fact for the province, in charge of determining provincial taxes, all on the recommendation of Prefect Domingo Tristán. The Liberal government would stay in power for a couple more years.

== Support for the Peruvian-Bolivian Confederation ==
There was a pause against the government between 1828 and 1838, when the Iquichians adhered to the idea of the Peru-Bolivian Confederation, seen as "the continuation of the empire by other means". Huachaca himself participated in the wars of the Confederacy between 1836 and 1839, and in 1838 he became Justice of the Peace and Governor of Carhuaucran District and Supreme Chief of the Republic of Iquicha, (Note: Referred to by himself as "Supreme Chief of the Republic of Iquicha, with insult to the Peruvian government and its laws") but when the Confederation was defeated by the Restoration Army of Peru in March 1839, the Iquichans were once again in arms against a Creole restoration, now supported by foreign bayonets. For this reason, the Catholic Army once again besieges Huanta, which was occupied by the Chilean “Cazadores” battalion. Faced with this serious situation, the prefect of Ayacucho, Colonel Lopera, sent reinforcements to the Chilean “Valdivia” battalion, which ended the siege and began an expedition in the highlands against the “indiada”.

In June 1839, the Battle of Campamento-Oroco took place, where General Huachaca surprised the expeditionaries and, in the midst of a storm, forced them to a disastrous retreat. The republican contingent, to avenge the humiliation inflicted: "[...] carried out a real slaughter of men —without distinguishing the elderly, children or women— and of cattle." Some 2,000 people died as a result.

In this context, on November 15, 1839, the general commander of the Peruvian government Manuel Lopera led an agreement with the Iquicha forces to find a negotiated solution to the conflict, for which the Treaty of Yanallay was signed, in the Yanallay plateau of Huanta; between Lopera and the Iquichan commander Tadeo Choqe, representing the great caudillo General José Antonio Navala Huachaca, who after 18 years of having proclaimed the Independence of Peru, formally committed to lay down their arms forever against the Peruvian government and to respect the laws of the nation. Thus, with a peace treaty, and not with a surrender, the Iquicha War ended. The Iquichan resistance was ending, which was supported by his leader, who left the following consigned in the document:

"Rather, you are the usurpers of Religion, Crown and Homeland [...] What has been obtained from you during your rule? Tyranny, grief, and ruin in a Kingdom that was so generous. What inhabitant, rich or poor, does not complain today? Where is the responsibility for the crimes? We do not carry such a tyranny."

— Antonio Huachaca

== Death ==
Huachaca preferred to enter the Apurimac jungle before yielding his monarchism to those he believed to be republican “antichrists”. There he lived until his death in 1848, being buried in the church of his native San José de Iquicha.

== See also ==
- Second siege of Callao

== Bibliography ==
- Aljovín de Losada, Cristóbal (2000). Caudillos y constituciones: Perú, 1821–1845. Fondo de Cultura Económica.
- Altuve-Febres Lores, Fernán (1996). Los Reinos del Perú: apuntes sobre la monarquía peruana.
- Basadre, Jorge (1998). Historia de la República del Perú, 1822–1933. Tomo I. La República.
- Bonilla, Heraclio (1996). La oposición de los campesinos indios a la República peruana: Iquicha, 1827. Departamento de Historia de Universidad Nacional de Colombia. pp. 143–157.
- Bonilla, Heraclio (2001). Metáfora y realidad de la Independencia en el Perú. Instituto de Estudios Peruanos.
- Cáceres-Olazo, Jorge Mariano (1999). Los campesinos del altiplano Q'ollavino en los movimientos contra el orden colonial (1800–1826). Facultad de Humanidades en la Universidad Nacional Federico Villarreal.
- Cavero, Luis (1953). Monografía de la Provincia de Huanta. Editorial Rimac.
- Ceinos, Pedro (1992). Abya-Yala: escenas de una historia india de América. Miraguano Ediciones. ISBN 978-84-7813-104-4.
- Cornejo Bouroncle, Jorge (1961). Banderas de la patria. Ediciones "Inca".
- Corsi Otálora, Luis (2009). Independencia hispano-americana: ¿espejismo trágico?. L. Corsi.
- Cristóbal, Juan (1983). Uchuraccay, o, El rostro de la barbarie. Editorial San Marcos.
- De Priego, Juan Manuel. El Conde Plebeyo: biografía de Abraham Valdelomar. Fondo Editorial del Congreso del Perú.
- Del Pino, Juan José (1955). Las sublevaciones indígenas de Huanta (1827–36). Aguilar Editorial.
- Del Pino Huamán, Ponciano (2008). Looking to the government": community, politics and the production of memory and silences in twentieth-century Peru, Ayacucho.
- Galdo Gutiérrez, Virgilio (1992). Ayacucho: conflictos y pobreza, historia regional (siglos XVI-XIX). Universidad Nacional San Cristóbal de Huamanga.
- Garayar de Lillo, Carlos (2003). Atlas departamental del Perú. Ayacucho: Ica. Peisa.
- García Camba, Andrés (1846). Memorias del general García Camba: para la historia de las armas españolas en el Perú (1822–1825). Vol II. Editorial América.
- Husson, Patrick (1992). De la guerra a la rebelión: (Huanta, siglo XIX). Centro de Estudios Regionales Andinos "Bartolomé de Las Casas" & Instituto Francés de Estudios Andinos.
- Luna Vegas, Emilio (1982). Perú y Chile en 5 siglos: revisión histórica. Librería Editorial Minerva.
- Méndez Gastelumendi, Cecilia (1991). Los campesinos, la independencia y la iniciación de la República, en Poder y violencia en los Andes. CBC.
- Méndez Gastelumendi, Cecilia (1997). Pactos sin tributo. Caudillos y campesinos en el Perú postindependiente: el caso de Ayacucho. Siglo XXI. Coordinación de Leticia Reina. ISBN 978-968-23-2097-2.
- Méndez Gastelumendi, Cecilia (2005a). The Plebeian Republic: The Huanta Rebellion and the Making of the Peruvian State, 1820–1850. Duke University Press. ISBN 978-0822334415.
- Méndez Gastelumendi, Cecilia (2005b). Tradiciones liberales en los Andes o la ciudadanía por las armas: campesinos y militares en la formación del Estado peruano. Concejo Superior de Investigaciones Científicas. Coordinación de Marta Irurozqui Victoriano. ISBN 978-8-40008-338-0.
- Méndez Gastelumendi, Cecilia (2008). Tradiciones liberales en los Andes: militares y campesinos en la formación del Estado peruano. Editorial Abya Yala. ISBN 978-9-97822-739-8.
- Meneses Lazón, Porfirio (1974). Huanta en la cultura peruana: edición antológica bilingüe con una extensa selección de literatura quechua.
- Reynaga Burgoa, Ramiro (1989). Tawaintisuyu: cinco siglos de guerra. Kheseaymara contra España. Consejo Indio de Sudamérica.
- Salas Guevara, Federico (2008). Historia de Huancavélica. Vol. I. Editorial San Marcos.
- Sánchez Torres, Simón E. (1984). 1883, 4.ª. Resistencia de la Breña: Huanta, Ayacucho, Acombaba, Tacayaja y Huancavelica. Municipalidad Distrital de San Juan de Lurigancho.
- Tomaylla, Nilo (2005). Crónicas del silencio. Hipocampo Editores. ISBN 9789972979354.
- Urbano, Henrique; Mirko, Lauer (1992). Poder y violencia en los Andes. Centro de estudios rurales andinos Bartolomé de las Casas.
- Walker, Charles F. (1999). De Túpac Amaru a Gamarra: Cusco y la formación del Perú republicano, 1780–1840. Centro de Estudios Regionales Andinos Bartolomé de las Casas. ISBN 9789972691263.
- Witt, Heinrich; Flórez-Estrada Garland, Gladys (1991). Diario (1824–90). Un testimonio personal sobre el Perú del siglo XIX. Tomo I. Banco Mercantil.
- Witt, Heinrich; Flórez-Estrada Garland, Gladys (1992). Diario (1824–90). Un testimonio personal sobre el Perú del siglo XIX. Tomo II. Banco Mercantil.
