= Battle of Huanta (1827) =

Battle during the 1825–28 Iquicha War

- Part of the Iquicha War of 1825–1828
Date	12 November 1827
Location	Huanta
Result	Royalist victory

Belligerents
Peru	(Peru) Iquicha

Commanders and leaders
Narciso Tudela	Antonio Huachaca

Strength
175 men	1,500 men

Casualties and losses
10–12 killed	60 killed

The Battle of Huanta took place between Peruvian and Royalist forces from Iquicha fighting in the name of Ferdinand VII in the town of Huanta during the Iquicha War of 1825–1828.

== Background ==
A first revolt of the indigenous people of the region had been put down with great violence by Marshal Andrés de Santa Cruz, with executions without trial of prisoners, confiscations of cattle, burning of towns and all kinds of violence against civilians, leaving a great resentment among the locals. After rising again to restore the Spanish monarchy in October 1827, the indigenous people of the punas near Huanta marched in the city. According to subsequent statements by the Spanish prisoner Manuel Gato, who was interrogated by the Peruvian army, under the orders of Brigadier General Antonio Huachaca, 500 residents of the town and 1,000 Indians from the highlands participated in this march.

== Battle ==
The Iquichans occupied the heights that dominate the town in the first days of November, in the staggered section between the Mio and Culluchaca hills, two or three leagues from the town. They were organized into battalions headed by the brigadier's lieutenants, Lanchi Curo, Tadeo Chocce (or Choque), Prudencio Huachaca, Sergeant Major Pedro Cárdenas, Santiago Méndez, and numerous indigenous regional commanders who operated guerrillas selected by towns, communities, and hamlets under their command. They were armed with rifles, rejones and slingshots, with barely five Spanish officers in their ranks.

Finally, at dawn on November 12, the rebels attacked the town from various directions to encircle the garrison. The defenders, some 175 soldiers from the Pichincha battalion, were entrenched in the local town hall under the command of Sergeant Major Narciso Tudela. The small force went out to meet the assailants, but after a weak resistance in the central streets of the town they had to flee to the main church of the town, where they were persecuted and locked up all day, being able to escape only at nightfall. The rebels lost 60 men in the fight, while their enemies 10 to 12; another 80 to 90 republican soldiers managed to flee to Ayacucho in small groups.

== Aftermath ==
Although most of the neighbors stayed, many preferred to flee to Ayacucho. There was no looting except for a few public buildings, but the main barracks were burned to the ground. Many republican soldiers sought refuge in the temples, but were still subjected to trials for their previous acts. The comuneros (Indians from rural communities) executed those who acted cruelly in the previous repression.

Huachaca organized the population to repair bridges and roads, regulate public order and collect tithes. On the 22nd to 24th of that month there were negotiations between both sides but they did not lead to anything. After this, the brigadier decided to advance to Ayacucho.

== Bibliography ==
- Bonilla Mayta, Heraclio (1996). La oposición de los campesinos indios a la República peruana: Iquicha, 1827. Anuario Colombiano de Historia Social y de la Cultura (Departamento de Historia de la Universidad Nacional de Colombia). ISSN 0120-2456.
- Cavero, Luis E. (1953). Monografía de la Provincia de Huanta. Lima: Editorial Rimac.
- Galdo Gutiérrez, Virgilio (1968). Visión histórica de Huamanga. Ayacucho: Universidad Nacional de San Cristóbal de Huamanga.
- Husson, Patrick (1992). De la guerra a la rebelión: (Huanta, siglo XIX). Cuzco: Centro de Estudios Regionales Andinos "Bartolomé de Las Casas" & Instituto Francés de Estudios Andinos.
- Méndez Gastelumendi, Cecilia (1991). Los campesinos, la independencia y la iniciación de la República. El caso de los iquichanos realistas: Ayacucho 1825-1828. Cuzco: Centro de Estudios Regionales Andinos Bartolomé de Las Casas.
- Reynaga Burgoa, Ramiro (1978). Tawantinsuyu: cinco siglos de guerra queswaymara contra España. La Paz: Centro de Coordinación y Promoción Campesina Mink'a.
