= Iquicha War of 1825–1828 =

1825–1828 conflict in South America

First Iquichan War
- Part of Peruvian War of Independence
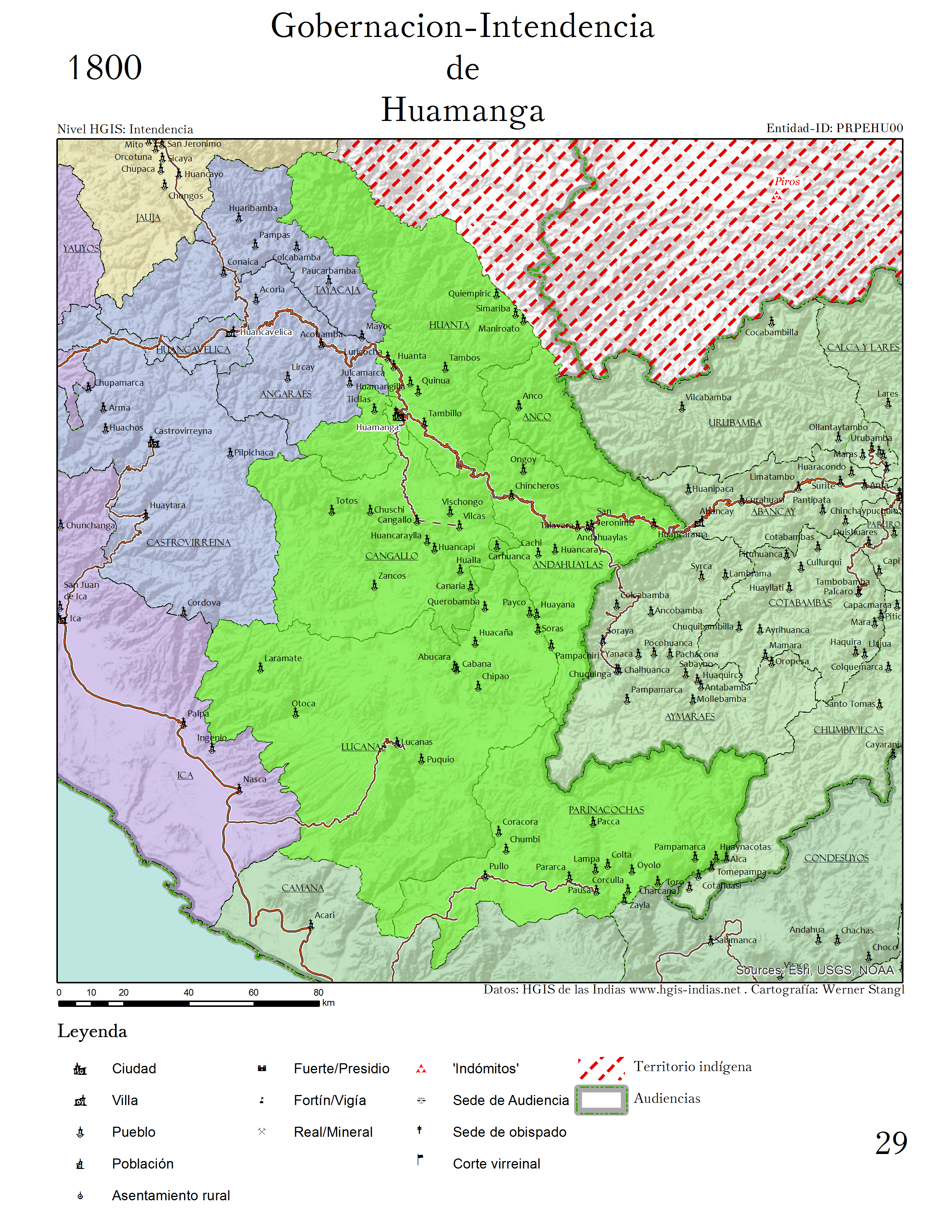
- Map of the Municipality of Huamanga.
Date	March 1825–June 1828 (3 years)
Location	Department of Ayacucho, Peru
Result	Peruvian victory; Annexation de facto of Iquicha

Belligerents
Peru	(Peru) Iquichanos loyalists

Commanders and leaders
(Peru) Andrés de Santa Cruz (Peru) Juan Pardo de Zela (Peru) Francisco de Paula Otero (Peru) Domingo Tristán	(Peru) Antonio Huachaca (Peru) Nicolás Soregui (POW) (Peru) Prudencio Huachaca †

Strength
7,000 troops 3,000 montoneras	25,000 Iquichanos rebels

Casualties and losses
2,000–2,700 casualties	9,000 killed 4,000 wounded 6,000 captured 10 flags Royalist captured

The First Iquichan War, Iquicha campaign of 1825–1828 or Iquicha War of 1825–1828 was a rebellion that broke out between 1825 and 1828 between local royalist peasants from Huanta known as Iquichanos and the army of the newly formed Peruvian Republic. The war ended with a Republican victory

== History ==
After the crushing defeat in the Battle of Ayacucho in December 1824, all Spanish troops had left Peru, except for the garrison at Callao. However, the Iquicha peasants from Huanta, remained loyal to the Spanish King and rebelled on three occasions against the new Peruvian Republic.

The first uprisings occurred in March and December 1825, but were easily subdued by the huge contingent of the Peruvian army that was still in the area. In January 1826, the Peruvian prefect of the area, General Juan Pardo de Zela, organized a punitive expedition, which only managed to harden their resistance.

A second uprising occurred on 5 June 1826, after the Republican army had dispersed throughout Peru. The rebels attacked Huanta, under the command of Antonio Huachaca and the former soldier and then Spanish merchant Nicolás Soregui (or Zoregui). Shortly after, on 6 July, two regiments of the Hussars of Junín stationed in Huancayo mutinied and joined the rebels, encouraging them to assault Ayacucho. Eventually they were repelled by the local garrison.

The third uprising took place at the beginning of October 1827, where Huachaca once again mobilized the population in favor of the Spanish King. On 12 November, Huachaca's forces came out of the mountains and attacked and took Huanta. When they also attacked Ayacucho on 29 November, they were defeated by troops under command of Prefect Domingo Tristán.

An other battle was fought in Uchuraccay, on 25 March 1828, when the Peruvians under command of Gabriel Quintanilla, defeated an Iquicha force during the "Pacification" phase, also known as the War of the Punas. Prudencio Huachaca, brother of Antonio Huachaca, was killed in this battle.

== Historiography ==
The movement is compared to the resistance of the Vendeans and Chuanes against the French Revolution. Similar situations existed, with peasant resistance to regular armies of nascent revolutionary states in San Juan de Pasto and Araucanía, in which they were flagged. in "tradition" as their ancestral right for self-determination. The conflict has also been defined as: "the time in which that piece of our country absurdly and fiercely resisted separating from Spain."

"The Iquichanos war was in itself a Vendée, which shows us the resistance that existed against a political system that was considered imposed. Antonio Huachaca, Huantino Indian and General of the Royal Army of Peru, rebuked the Republicans (XI-21-1827) saying: "You are rather the usurpers of the religion of the crown and the national soil... What do you know?" has obtained from you during these three years of your power? The tyranny, the despair and the ruin of a kingdom that was so generous. What inhabitant, whether rich or poor, does not complain today? On whom does the responsibility of the crimes? We do not bear such tyranny."

— Altuve-Febres Lores, Fernán (1996)., Los Reinos del Perú: apuntes sobre la monarquía peruana. Lima: Estudio Altuve-Febres y Dupuy.

Some historians (currently criticized) refer to the indigenous people as a "formless and ahistorical mass" because the majority of them lived scattered in valleys with difficult access and with an "archaic" culture based on respect for tradition. Like other peasant communities, they were not "isolated" from politics, but played a key role in the formation of the Peruvian State, the "Cadillo State", a period from the 1820s to 1840s characterized by constant struggle between ambitious caudillos.

Authors such as Patrick Husson or Carlos Iván Pérez Aguirre, with sympathies to Marxism and making use of Historical Materialism, interpret the rebellion as the manifestation of "alienation" (according to the definition of Henri Favre) among the Huantine rebels, which in the Indians was a product of the ideological restriction that the rural environment generated in their consciousness, causing them not to understand the benefits of Liberalism due to the dominance of the colonial ideology that alienated them (reducing the traditionalist monarchical initiative only to whites, who only they would perceive that type of society as the only possible legitimate system, while they only took advantage of the frustrations of the indigenous people), while the failure of the Republic of Peru among the Huantin peasants was due to the nonexistence of "political parties or progressive organizations that, representing peasant interests, organize these masses and turn them against the subsisting feudal regime in order to fulfill their demands" which would only cause great deficiencies in the class consciousness of the indigenous people and peasants of Huantín to fulfill their role in the dialectical movement of history to "fulfill their demands, especially its right to land, under the leadership of the revolutionary bourgeoisie and, when its historical role has expired, only under the leadership of the proletariat." However, the conclusions have been accused of being very limited and reductionist, failing to understand the complexity of the event and the indigenous peasantry in the viceregal context, the greatest deficiency of the analysis being that it only makes a reading from the perspective of economic classes (in specific, of the dominant and liberal class, assuming a priori that their policies would be effective against the anti-liberal dominant class) and leaving aside the experience and perception of the indigenous Estates to the power mechanisms of the viceregal institutionality. That would only cause incomprehension of the political imagination of the indigenous peasantry as the possibility was not conceived in the analysis of a sincere conviction of these with reactionary thinking, without alienation of conscience and based on their own local political tradition, since that possibility would violate Marxist and liberals dogmas about the historical purpose of the bourgeois Revolutions (which assume a priori that they are inevitably progressive in nature, so the possibility of another alternative of progress outside of political Modernization being inconceivable, which would question the Marxist postulates on the inevitable development of a revolutionary class consciousness in the popular sectors towards the End of history). Authors such as Heraclio Bonilla argue that these historicist exercises have only caused contemporary intellectuals to lack knowledge of the political worldview of the indigenous peasantry of that time and their tendency towards royalism (a phenomenon also present in the Pastusos, Chilotas or Mapuches), and that the cause of these bad practices is the ideological burden of the official historiography of the Peruvian State (and similar modernist governments) with its attempt to base its legitimacy on the dominance of the Criollo bourgeois class based on a reading of the facts with nationalist and liberal biases (trying to assume a priori that these modern ideologies were present, or were determined to be potentially present, in the popular sectors, and making it a logical impossibility to assume any popular opposition to the modern nation-state project or the sincere defense of Pactism with the Ancient Regime of Spain).

"As is known, traditional national historiography has privileged the examination of this period, and has unanimously maintained that all groups of colonial society, regardless of their ethnic and class affiliation, resolutely supported the Creole leadership. Independence Therefore, it would have been the result of a unanimous process, in addition to a completely autonomous decision and execution. The ideological load that this version contains cannot explain, by the way, why the presence of the armies of San Martín and of Bolívar, for the definitive achievement of the independence of Ecuador, Peru and Bolivia. (...) consequently, examining once again in this context the "nationalism", real or potential, of the indigenous peasantry does not make much sense, since the answer is quite obvious (...) On the other hand, the allusion to the peasant rejection of the republican system as a response to the tax extortions and abuses of the patriot army, is nothing more than a confirmation, in the same way as the innovation to the absence of a bourgeoisie as a limiting factor of peasant mobilization says more about the author than about the reality he is trying to analyze. A more convincing explanation of peasant support for the colonial regime and King Ferdinand VII would rather take the situation of 1827 as the necessary result of a durable and specific political and cultural experience of the Indian peasantry within the colonial context. Which in turn implies a rigorous reconstruction of its political history in the long term, through evidence that is enough for now to confirm that the Iquichana rebellion of 1827 says how little we know about the colonial articulation of the peasants, and of the political vision they shared."

— Heraclio Bonilla

Authors such as Cecilia Mendez do not consider that the Huantine rebellion was the expression of a supposed archaic mentality of ignorant indigenous people and religious fanatics who opposed progress, due to their servile and submissive nature to the powerful classes, which prevented them from knowing what was best for them. for their passivity towards their oppressors; but in reality the Huantine peasants would have managed to act out of their own motivations and with an active role, in which they were not good savages who had been manipulated by their innocent ignorance (being an erroneous popular belief that would have analogies with public opinion about the Uchuraccay Massacre), but rather they were people who were fully aware of what they were doing and sought to defend a political project with solid foundations to predict the progress of their community (since the republican structures of the nascent Peruvian state could not integrate them, but rather In fact, it threatened their status obtained during the Spanish empire, making the defense of the monarchy something that is not something ignorant).

“They have continued to say, without evidence to support their claims (that is, based on prejudices), that the peasants of Huanta rebelled because they resisted the new. But I am convinced that those who resist the new, more often than the characters studied, are those who study them."

— Cecilia Méndez

Furthermore, Cecilia Mendez, according to her historical vision of monarchism, does not interpret the rebellion as proof that there were reactionary political convictions in the Huantino peasantry (in contrast to the case of the French Royalistes of the Vendeé), and that the reasons for their rebellion would have been because that, in the Republic, the ethnic hierarchies bequeathed by the viceregal times were altered, not so much by traditionalist monarchical convictions (which would have been reduced to merely propaganda in the counterrevolutionary pamphlets made by Spaniards and priests), although it admits the existence of an indigenous or popular realism (which were related to the political rituals that had been essential in the traditional political life that developed in the Spanish monarchy), but that said loyalty to the King of Spain was conditioned by an instrumental convenience to legitimize the political project of the Huantine peasants in the pacts contained in the vassalage of their community, and not so much because of a sincere conviction that monarchy was the best form of government (except in leading caudillos like Huachaca) or the belief that said pacts could only be fulfilled only with the protection of the Spanish Crown (advocating future alliances with the Peru-Bolivian Confederation). Therefore, it was more an anti-republicanism (or specifically, a specific denial of the authority of the Republic of Peru) than a Hispanist monarchism that founded the rebellion, which even took the liberties of developing new fiscal institutions, challenging ethnic hierarchies (both colonial and republican) and other types of reforms that were not present in the legislation of the Spanish monarchy at the time, so the monarchism of the rebellion was dynamic, a fundamental creative element, to protect mostly its own local interest and not so much that of the Spanish monarchical state. Finally, he would postulate the idea that the Huantine peasants sought the “dissolution of ethnicities” (to abolish the legal differences between the republic of Indians and that of Spaniards), and that deep down they were envisioning a new “subversive” order with liberal tendencies that would become more present decades later.

“Monarchism represented more of an instrumental option than an ideological one. That is to say, the king was invoked as a symbol of prestige and a source of legitimacy, but the monarchy as a political system was not necessarily professed by the local people (...) there was little defense here of the 'ancient regime'; There was little of the 'naïve monarchism' and redemptive messianism (or of a supposed 'conservative' and 'retrograde' ideology) that some have associated with the monarchist sympathies of peasants and rural populations, in general, in other contexts"

— Cecilia Mendez

However, this position of Cecilia Mendez, doubting the monarchism of the rebellion, would be questioned for being based on academically questionable assumptions (assuming an influence from the impact of the Tupac Amaru II Rebellion or wanting to prove that its consequences involved the Republic of Peru integrate the peasants into a Plebeian Republic) and not fully integrate the Atlantic dimension of the historical context (the political imaginaries in the Spanish empire and Western civilization) with the dynamics of the local or regional history of the area. Thus, their historical vision of monarchism would have been limited to an insufficient understanding of the monarchical imagination of the population in their political tradition, which despite their local interests, could be evidenced in their political rituals that were highly influenced by the political philosophies of the Ancient Regime at a global level (such reactionary philosophies, due to the biases in hegemonic liberal and nationalist Historiography, would today be difficult to understand without resorting to primary sources). The great error of interpretation of Mendéz, and his supporters skeptical of monarchism, is to rely mostly on secondary sources of the event, which could include liberal interpretations that would be anachronistic and favorable to the ideology of the Peruvian Republic with its denial of the authenticity of said monarchism in the popular sectors, of which it is assumed a priori that they were predisposed to be liberal (for which the sole idea of defending anti-liberal monarchism was perceived as something discreditable, retrograde and anachronistic, instead of being considered that the defense of the Old Regime could have been a perfectly rational and sincere proposal in the popular sectors).

"This notion of the importance and relevance of the monarchical imaginary in Peru in the transition from the 18th to the 19th century is equally applicable to the total extension of the Spanish empire, as demonstrated in the now classic works of François-Xavier Guerra and Jaime Rodríguez. Furthermore, in view of the widespread teleological vision of the revolutionary process in the historiography of the period, it is necessary to emphasize that in no way was independence something certain or predictable at the time, so the commitment to monarchy was something completely logical and coherent for broad sectors of the American population (...) It is here, however, that we see the first tension in Méndez's proposal. The other elements of monarchism, the cultural practices and political rituals that were central to political life within monarchy, are discussed in [Méndez's] text only from secondary sources and as a historical presupposition. These should be explored with greater attention and depth to more solidly explain the recourse to monarchy by peasants and indigenous people. I say this because this rebellion, as well as other cases of popular realism in America during the independence, reveal the vitality of the monarchical imagination among peasants and indigenous people, which is evidence of the symbolic aspect that sustained a power that was articulated through broader contexts. than the regional one. And in its breadth, the monarchy functioned through mechanisms as flexible and solid as, precisely, invoking the king as a source of prestige and legitimacy. For this reason, rather than discarding the authenticity of the use of monarchist language in Huanta, its study would be enriched by giving greater attention to the history of monarchical practices as they were constructed over time, in their different social dimensions and cultural expressions (... ) the nineteenth-century nationalist narrative erased or distorted the image of the defenders of the king and the monarchy, condemning them to oblivion, and their ideals—whatever they were—to failure and disappearance. Ignorance of the widespread consolidation of monarchist alliances in the context of the wars of independence has obscured our understanding of their implications for early republican politics. Even today, when Spanish-American independence is the object of growing interest on the eve of the bicentennial, most works focus exclusively on “protoliberal” processes, spheres and actors (...) And finally, without taking away the merit "to the thematic and analytical proposal, it is ironic that although this work proposes such an interesting alternative as addressing political languages other than the revolutionary one, hegemonic in the historiography of Independence, it ends with an apology for popular liberalism"

— Marcela Echeverri

At the same time, regarding the idea that the Huantine peasants sought the “dissolution of ethnicities”, that is, to establish Equality before the liberal law, based on the presentation of an alliance between both Indian and Spanish estates that was unified in the leadership of Antonio Huachaca, would be questioned by Heraclio Bonilla, for not having been the first time that Spaniards accepted the leadership of an Indian (since a corporate strategy had actually been practiced between the different groups, maintaining their differences despite their common pact), and that this would not have to imply a potential predisposition of the Huantine peasants to legal liberalism. In turn, the future submission to the Peruvian-Bolivian Confederation (an anti-centralist republic) by the Huantine peasants in 1837-1839 would not be a sign that during 1825-1828 there was no sincere monarchist political traditionalism, and that assuming its absence based on a future event (with a different context from the defense of the empire by other means) would be a Non sequitur conclusion.

“In the best of cases it is a change that reflects the tension of a situation of war, and whose meaning cannot be extrapolated, ex post, to the previous colonial process. After all, as [the author] contradictorily acknowledges, 'This was not, of course, the first time in the history of vice royalty (or nascent Republic) that a Spaniard or [C]reole had been subordinated to an Indian'. Reciprocally, Méndez's assertion that his apparent rejection of the country actually hid the desire of his leaders to find recognition and a place in the new order, is based on the appointment of the leader Antonio Navala Huachaca as justice of the peace of Carhuahuarán. in 1837 and the recognition as districts, the new administrative demarcation of the Republic, of the population centers included in the rebellion. Maybe. But taking up arms in favor of Ferdinand VII at the risk of his own life was not trivial rhetoric, nor is it pertinent to formulate prophecies of the past based on processes that occurred in another context."

— Heraclio Bonilla

In turn, the author César Félix Sánchez-Martínez considers that the analysis of Méndez and similar, despite the valuable contribution in their attempt to avoid falling into the biases of the Republican Creole Oligarchy (by trying to empathize with the Huantino peasants without the stereotypes of who were submissive ignorant enemies of progress), on the other hand, would have maintained a liberal republican bias under paternalistic means by wanting to attribute a potential liberalism in the Huantine rebels that did not really exist. This malpractice would have arisen from assuming that the possibility of a sincere defense of traditionalist monarchism would have been something negative and a confirmation of the accusations of apparent irrationality of the Huantinos (rather than, rather, that the sincere rejection of political modernity would not have occurred). have to imply something negative), so he would have done an ideological exercise of assimilating the Huantinos into the modernist political culture to defend their rational capacities, instead of focusing on challenging the erroneous notions that the defense of traditionalist political culture has been a sign of irrationality (thus, this historiography would contribute to a misunderstanding of the political culture of the Royal Army of Peru with its sincere defense of the Counterrevolution, being a reactionary political culture that has been forgotten by the same dominant and ideologized historiography from which he was trying to distance himself).

== See for more details ==
- Republic of Iquicha
- Battle of Huanta (1827)

== Sources ==
- Husson, Patrick : DE LA GUERRA A LA REBELIÓN (HUANTA, SIGLO XIX)
- Galdo Gutiérrez, Virgilio (1992). Ayacucho: conflictos y pobreza, historia regional (siglos XVI-XIX). Ayacucho: Universidad Nacional San Cristóbal de Huamanga.
- Bonilla, Heraclio (1996). "La oposición de los campesinos indios a la República peruana: Iquicha, 1827". Anuario Colombiano de Historia Social y de la Cultura. No. 23. Departamento de Historia de Universidad Nacional de Colombia: 143-157
- Méndez Gastelumendi, Cecilia (2005a). «Tradiciones liberales en los Andes o la ciudadanía por las armas: campesinos y militares en la formación del Estado peruano». En Marta Irurozqui Victoriano, ed. La mirada esquiva: reflexiones históricas sobre la interacción del Estado y la ciudadanía en los Andes (Bolivia, Ecuador y Perú), siglo XIX. Madrid: Concejo Superior de Investigaciones Científicas. pp. 125-154. ISBN 978-84-00-08338-0
- Méndez Gastelumendi, Cecilia (2005b): The Plebeian Republic: The Huanta Rebellion and the Making of the Peruvian State, 1820–1850 (en inglés). Durham: Duke University Press
