= Battle of Ica =

Coordinates: 14°2′11″S 75°46′45″W

- Part of the Peruvian War of Independence
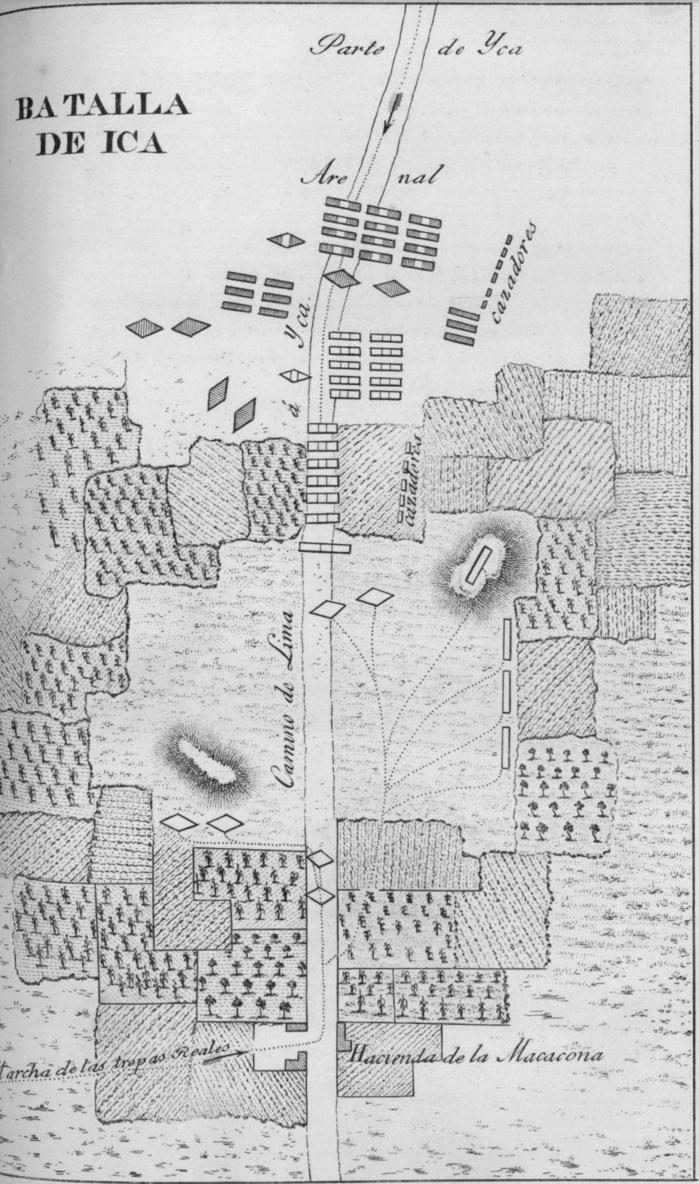
- 1829 sketch of the Battle of Ica
| Date | 7 April 1822 |
| Location | hacienda Macacona near Ica, Department of Ica, Peru |
| Result | Royalist victory |

Belligerents
| Liberating Expedition; Protectorate of Peru | Spain |

Commanders and leaders
| Domingo Tristán; Agustín Gamarra; Santiago Aldunate | (Spain) José de Canterac (Spain) Valentín Ferraz |

Strength
| 2,244 men 6 cannons | 2,000 men |

Casualties and losses
| Hundreds of casualties 1,000 captured | Unknown |

The Battle of Ica or Disaster at Macacona was a battle during the Peruvian War of Independence, which occurred on 7 April 1822 at the Hacienda Macacona near Ica, between the Liberation Army of Peru under command of Peruvian General Domingo Tristán, and the Spanish Royal Army under Gen. Brigadier José de Canterac. The Patriot army was decisively routed.

== Prelude ==
On 21 August 1820, a Liberation Expedition from Chile set sail from Valparaíso, landed south of Lima on 7 September 1820, and north of Lima in November 1820. José de San Martín led the expedition of 4,118 Patriot soldiers. The coastline provinces surrounding Lima switched to the patriot side. San Martín entered Lima in July 1821.

The Spanish Viceroy José de la Serna fled to Cuzco, but his General José de Canterac remained in the mountainous Jauja Province, some 150 km from Lima.
José de San Martín appointed Domingo Tristán, a militia colonel from Arequipa, as General and commander of a force to check the movements of the royalist troops. Tristán was instructed not to engage the enemy, but to withdraw in the event of a Royalist advance. Tristán marched his battalions from Lima to Ica.

== The Battle ==
Canterac, headquartered in Jauja, decided to attack the Patriot troops at Ica. On 26 March 1822, Canterac led some 1500 infantry, 600 cavalry and 3 fieldguns. He arrived in the area of Ica on 6 April. Upon receiving notice of Canterac's proximity, Tristán retreated back towards the port town of Pisco on the return road to Lima. Anticipating the move, Canterac positioned his troops at the Hacienda Macacona, cutting off Tristán's strategic retreat. Tristán, unaware of Canterac's movement, marched his battalions straight into the trap that Canterac had set.

At 1 a.m., but under a moonlit sky, the Royalist troops opened fire on the retreating column. Many Patriots were killed or wounded and the column dispersed almost immediately. By 3 a.m., the battlefield was covered with dead and wounded Patriots. 1000 soldiers and 50 officers were taken prisoner, of which many defected to the Royalists. The Royalists also captured 4 cannons, 2 flags, 2000 rifles, 200 gunshots and 100 sabers. Tristán, Gamarra and some 125 men managed to escape. José Santiago Aldunate was taken prisoner. Spanish commander Juan Loriga was sent to occupy Pisco.

== Aftermath ==
Upon his arrival in Lima, Tristán was tried by court-martial for his responsibility in the disaster and, although he was acquitted, he never returned to active service in the army.

The outcome of the battle increased the material and morale of the Royalists. From now on, the Patriots in Southern Peru were on the defensive. After inflicting further defeats in January 1823, the Royalist general José Canterac would reoccupy Lima on 18 June 1823.

== Sources ==
- Historia Argentina
- Batalla de Macacona: hito que impulsó a la comunidad
