= Peruvian War of Independence =

1809–1826 war against Spanish rule

- Part of the Spanish American Wars of Independence
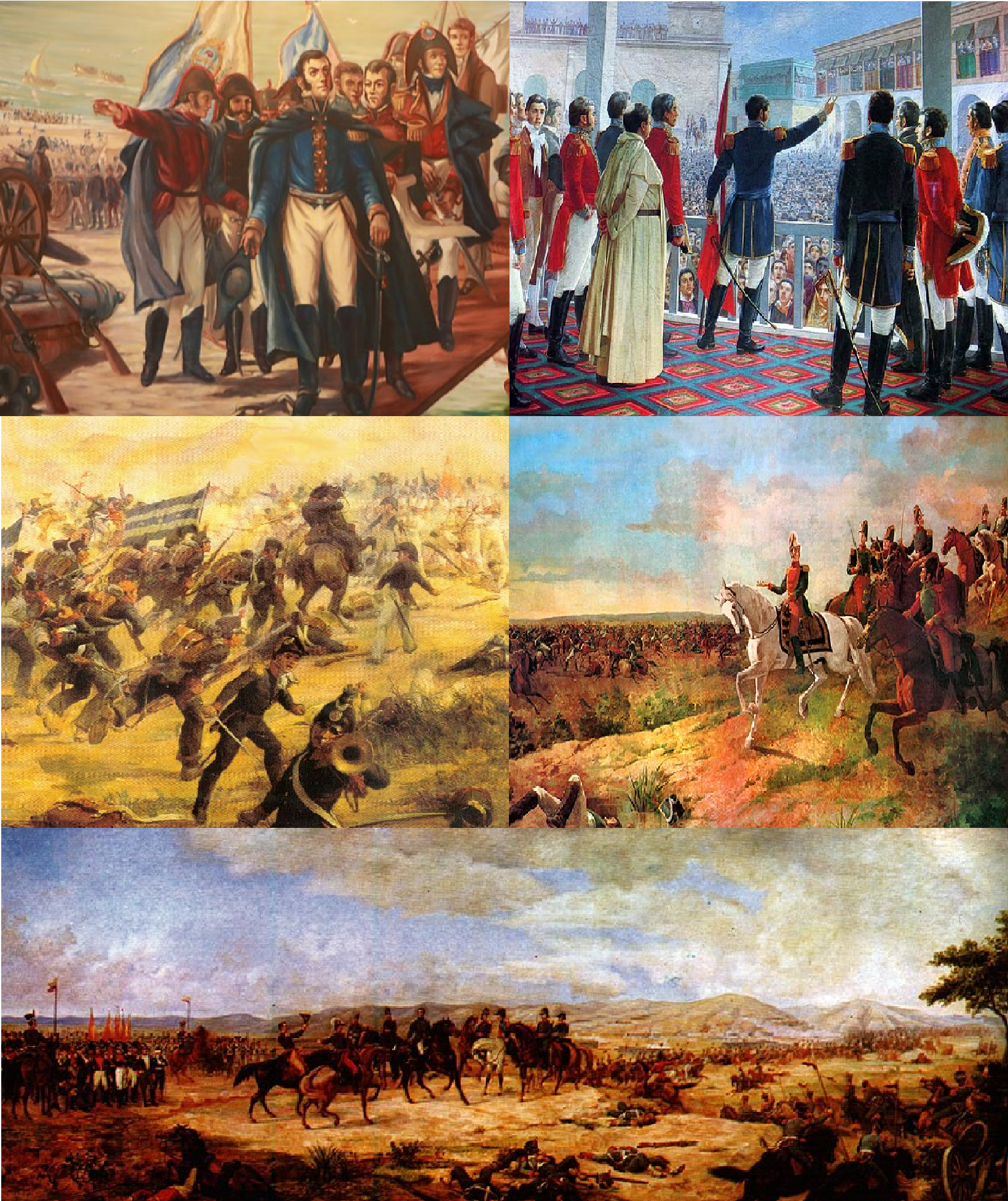
- Clockwise, left to right: José de San Martín's landing in Paracas, the declaration of independence in Lima, the Battle of Camino Real in Ecuador, the Battle of Junín, and the Battle of Ayacucho.
Date	1809–1827 (18 years)
Location	Viceroyalty of Peru and Real Audiencia of Charcas
Result	Patriot victory; Peru emerges as an independent state in 1821.; Dissolution of the Peruvian viceroyalty in 1824.; Peru rejected the Bolivarian Confederation in 1827.; The First Iquicha War continues until 1828.
Territorial changes	The Spanish Empire loses the entire Viceroyalty of Peru.; The General Command of Maynas is annexed by the patriots in 1823.; Callao, occupied by Gran Colombia, is returned to Peru in 1827.; Iquicha is annexed de facto in 1828.; General recognition by Spain of continental Spanish America's independence in 1836.; Signing of a bilateral treaty between Spain and Peru: the Treaty of Paris of 1879.

Belligerents
Patriot forces: Peruvian rebels (1809–1820); Protectorate of Peru (1821–1822); Peruvian Republic (1822–1826); Co-belligerents: United Provinces (1820–1822); Chile (1823–1826); Gran Colombia (1823–1826)	Royalists: Spain; (Spain) Viceroyalty of Peru; Iquicha (until 1839)

Commanders and leaders
Francisco de Zela (POW) #; Juan José Crespo (executed); Mateo Pumacahua (executed); Mariano Melgar (executed); Angulo brothers (executed); Clemente Casanga (executed); Antonio Casanga (executed); José Olaya (executed); José de la Riva Agüero; José Bernardo de Tagle †; Toribio de Luzuriaga; Ramón Castilla; Agustín Gamarra; José de la Mar; Felipe Salaverry; Martin George Guisse; Co-belligerents: Simón Bolívar; Antonio José de Sucre; José de San Martín; Juan Gregorio de las Heras; Carlos María de Alvear; Bernardo O'Higgins; Thomas Cochrane	Royalists: Ferdinand VII; José de Abascal #; José de Goyeneche; Joaquín de la Pezuela; José de la Serna (surrendered); José de Canterac (surrendered); Mariano Osorio (POW); Melchor Aymerich (surrendered); Pedro Antonio Olañeta †; Antonio de Quintanilla (POW); (Spain) José de La Mar (surrendered); (Spain) Andrés de Santa Cruz (POW); Supported by: Antonio Huachaca (WIA); Prudencio Huachaca †; Nicolás Soregui (executed)

Units involved
Patriot Army: Peruvian Army; Peruvian Navy; Peruvian irregulars troops: Montoneros; Civilians volunteers; Co-belligerent armies: Gran Colombian Army; British Legions; Gran Colombia Navy; Chilean Army; Chilean Navy; Army of the Andes	Royal Army of Peru: Royalist troops (85%); Peninsular troops (15%); Spanish Navy; Iquichan rebels: Iquichan Army

Casualties and losses
- In total, 175,000–250,000 deaths 100,000–150,000 Royalists captured and expelled

The Peruvian War of Independence (Spanish: Guerra de Independencia del Perú) was a series of military conflicts in Peru from 1809 to 1826. Part of the broader Spanish American wars of independence, it led to the dissolution of the Spanish Viceroyalty of Peru and the emergence of Peru as an independent state on 28 July 1821. The Battle of Ayacucho in 1824 secured the independence of Peru and definitively ended Spanish rule in South America. However, Peru achieved full sovereignty only after the end of Simon Bolívar's influence and the Gran Colombian military occupation. His Federation of the Andes project was discarded and the last Gran Colombian garrison returned the Real Felipe Fortress to the Peruvians on 16 February 1827.

Throughout the colonial period of Peru, there were several social uprisings, though none constituted a true independence movement. The Rebellion of Túpac Amaru II, although not the first or the last, was the most significant and culminated in violent repression by the viceregal authorities. This uprising erupted in response to the Bourbon Reforms and was the first time that viceregal documents used the term "insurgents." It was also a movement that proclaimed the abolition of slavery in Peru. However, there is debate as to whether the purpose of this rebellion was truly independence or a revolution of the viceregal social order.

The Atlantic liberal revolutions transformed the political map of both America and Europe. French Emperor Napoleon Bonaparte's 1808 invasion of Spain resulted in the abdications of Charles IV and Ferdinand VII in favour of Joseph Bonaparte. In Spanish America, autonomous governments arose in the power vacuum and instability of mainland Spain in Europe. Initially, Peru was a stronghold for royalists, with Viceroy José Fernando de Abascal y Sousa using Peru as a base for counterrevolutionary forces.

In 1820, the Liberating Expedition of Peru, under the command of Argentine general José de San Martín, forced the viceroyalty to abandon Lima and retreat to Cusco. However, disagreements between San Martín and Simón Bolívar at the Guayaquil Conference over how to govern divided patriot forces and led to San Martín's withdrawal in 1822. Fighting continued under Bolivar until the decisive defeat of the Spanish Army in 1824, followed by the surrender of the last major Spanish stronghold at Callao in 1826.

== Background ==
Some of the early Spanish conquistadors who explored Peru made the first attempts for independence from the Spanish crown. They tried to liberate themselves from the Viceroyalty, who governed on behalf of the king of Castile. Throughout the eighteenth century, there were several indigenous uprisings against colonial rule and their treatment by the colonial authorities. Some of these uprisings became true rebellions. The Bourbon Reforms increased the unease, and the dissent had its outbreak in the 1780–1781 uprising led by Túpac Amaru II. Which was repressed, but the root cause of the discontent of the indigenous people remained dormant. It is debated whether these movements should be considered as precedents of the emancipation that was led by chiefs (caudillos), Peruvian towns (pueblos), and other countries in the American continent.

During the Peninsular War (1807–1814) central authority in the Spanish Empire was lost and many regions established autonomous juntas. The viceroy of Peru, José Fernando de Abascal y Sousa was instrumental in organizing armies to suppress uprisings in Upper Peru and defending the region from armies sent by the juntas of the Río de la Plata. After success of the royalist armies, Abascal annexed Upper Peru to the viceroyalty, which benefited the Lima merchants as trade from the silver-rich region was now directed to the Pacific. Because of this, Peru remained strongly royalist and participated in the political reforms implemented by the Cortes of Cádiz (1810–1814), despite Abascal's resistance. Peru was represented at the first session of the Cortes by seven deputies and local cabildos (representative bodies) became elected. Therefore, Peru became the second to last redoubt of the Spanish Monarchy in South America, after Upper Peru.

== Junta movements and uprisings (1809–1814) ==
Despite the royalist tendencies of Upper Peru and overall lack of political unrest from the general public between the end of the Rebellion of Túpac Amaru II (which ended in 1783) and 1808, junta movements did emerge. Within this period, divisions between Upper Peru and Southern Peru were evident, especially through the mining industry within the country, with the South overall suffering economically due to discrimination which ultimately provoked bitter protest from mining deputies of Southern Peru in 1804. This was evidently the start of unrest and uprising of the junta movements between the divided country which caused royalist officials to become more aware and cautious of Cuzco and the southern parts of Perú as a whole. Political unrest amped up after the crumbling of the Peruvian government structure, and after being effected by the collapse of monarchy within Spain, the country that colonized Peru, in 1808.

Between 1809 and 1814, arguably the timeframe of the major junta movements and protests, Cuzco and the southern provinces of Peru were administratively and politically unstable, as expected from a country whose government is going through a general crisis. This time frame has been characterized by uncertainty and overall confusing after the implementation of the Junta Central and the Council of Regency, efforts made by the then newly monarch-less and overruling Spain.

=== Tacna rebellion (1811) ===
The first significant attempt of an armed rebellion was the 1811 Tacna rebellion, led by Francisco Antonio de Zela. Though this rebellion was more personal, as it had to do with a direct issue Antonio de Zela faced, it demonstrated the desire in the southern region of Peru to reunite with Upper Peru. This movement also proved that those who rebelled in the provinces of southern Peru were much closer with one another, regardless of socioeconomic status, race, or ethnicity than those in Upper Peru (specifically Lima). This was significant due to the divisions between citizens due to features such as race and background and that though there may have been tensions between the groups, their common belief that Peru should be independent from Spanish-ruling overpowered all other differences they may have had.

=== Huánuco rebellion (1812) ===
Another significant movement, led by natives in Huánuco, began on 22 February 1812. This movement was partially initiated by the motives of Juan Jose Castelli within the First Upper Peru Campaign. It was also begun as a protest against the corruption within local governments which illegally implemented a policy that disadvantaged indigenous merchants in the area. The rebellion lasted three months, ending in May 1812, and was like the Tacna movement, uniting more citizens in southern Peru of different backgrounds and proved the anti-peninsular beliefs of rebels a part of the junta movements. It involved various leaders, including curacas and township magistrates (alcaldes pedáneos), but was suppressed within a few weeks.

=== Rebellion of Cuzco (1814-1815) ===
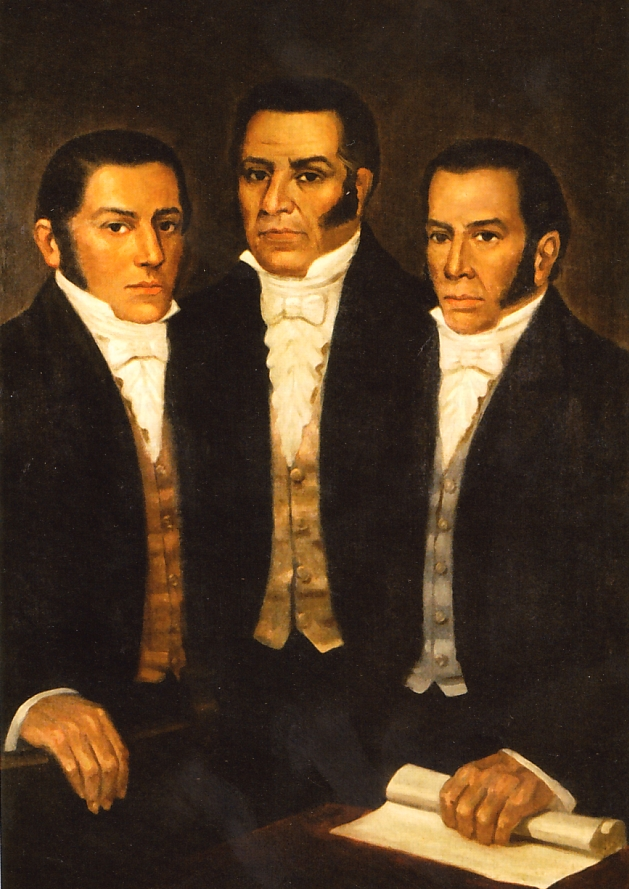
The brothers José, Vicente and Mariano Angulo, leaders of the Cuzco Rebellion of 1814.

More enduring was the Rebellion of Cuzco from 1814 to 1815.

The rebellion began in a confrontation between the Constitutional Cabildo and the Audiencia of Cuzco, made up of officeholders and Europeans, over the administration of the city and spread much more rapidly than any prior movement. Cabildo officials and their allies were arrested by the Audiencia. Seemingly a culmination of the prior rebellions, the motives of the 1814 movement declared by the main leaders included the struggle for power (specifically independent power from Spain), the disapproval of Fernando VII and the lack of application of promised reforms by the Audiencia. Criollo leaders appealed to retired brigadier Mateo Pumacahua, then in his 70s, who was curaca of Chinchero, and decades earlier had been instrumental in suppressing the Rebellion of Túpac Amaru II. This was monumental as Pumacahua changed his beliefs for the national cause, something he was against when rebelling against Túpac Amaru II's similar stance in the Rebellion of Túpac Amaru II earlier. The rebellion continued to move their efforts towards Lima and Upper Peru to inspire and spread attention to the public and officials opposed to their beliefs. This movement also made note of the uselessness of the position of viceroyalty as a whole, though specifically in Upper Peru where it was the center of Royalist reaction Pumacahua joined the Criollo leaders in forming a junta on 3 August in Cuzco, which demanded the complete implementation of the liberal reforms of the Spanish Constitution of 1812. After some victories in southern Peru and Upper Peru, the rebellion was squashed by mid-1815 when a combined strength of royal forces and loyal curacas, among which were the Catacora and Apo Cari took Cuzco and executed Pumacahua.

== Consolidation of Royalist power (1815–1820) ==
After the squashing of the aforementioned rebellion, Peru remained firmly in the hands of the Royalists.
Reinforced with the royalist regiments of Lima and Arequipa, and expeditionary elements from Europe, the Viceroy of Peru organised several expeditions against the Patriots in Chile, Bolivia and Argentina. Meanwhile, Patriot forces, overwhelmed in their attempts to advance through Upper Peru, shifted their strategy under the leadership of José de San Martin. In 1814, he began organizing a new approach which consisted of an audacious attack on Chile from the west, crossing the formidable Andes. The assault commenced in January 1817, and by April of the following year, Royalist forces had been so thoroughly defeated that Santiago was secure, with only sparse remnants of Royalist resistance remaining. This victory in Chile not only secured a vital territory for the Patriots but also drew the attention and resources of the Royalists away from other fronts, weakening their hold on the region.

The first expedition was successful in reconquering Chile after winning the Battle of Rancagua. The capital Santiago was reoccupied in October 1814 and Vicente San Bruno embarked on a campaign of fierce political persecution. The Spanish reconquest of Chile ended after their defeat in the Battle of Chacabuco (February 1817).

The second expedition against the Chilean Patriots in 1818 was a new attempt to restore the monarchy. Initially it was successful in the Second Battle of Cancha Rayada (19 March), the expedition was finally defeated by José de San Martín in the Battle of Maipú (5 April).

The Viceroy of Peru also successfully defended Upper Peru against the United Provinces of the Río de la Plata, with victories in the Battle of Viluma (1815), Yavi (1816) and Sopachuy (1817).

== Liberation campaigns of San Martín and Bolívar (1820–1825) ==
=== Liberating Expedition and the Peruvian Republic (1820-1822) ===
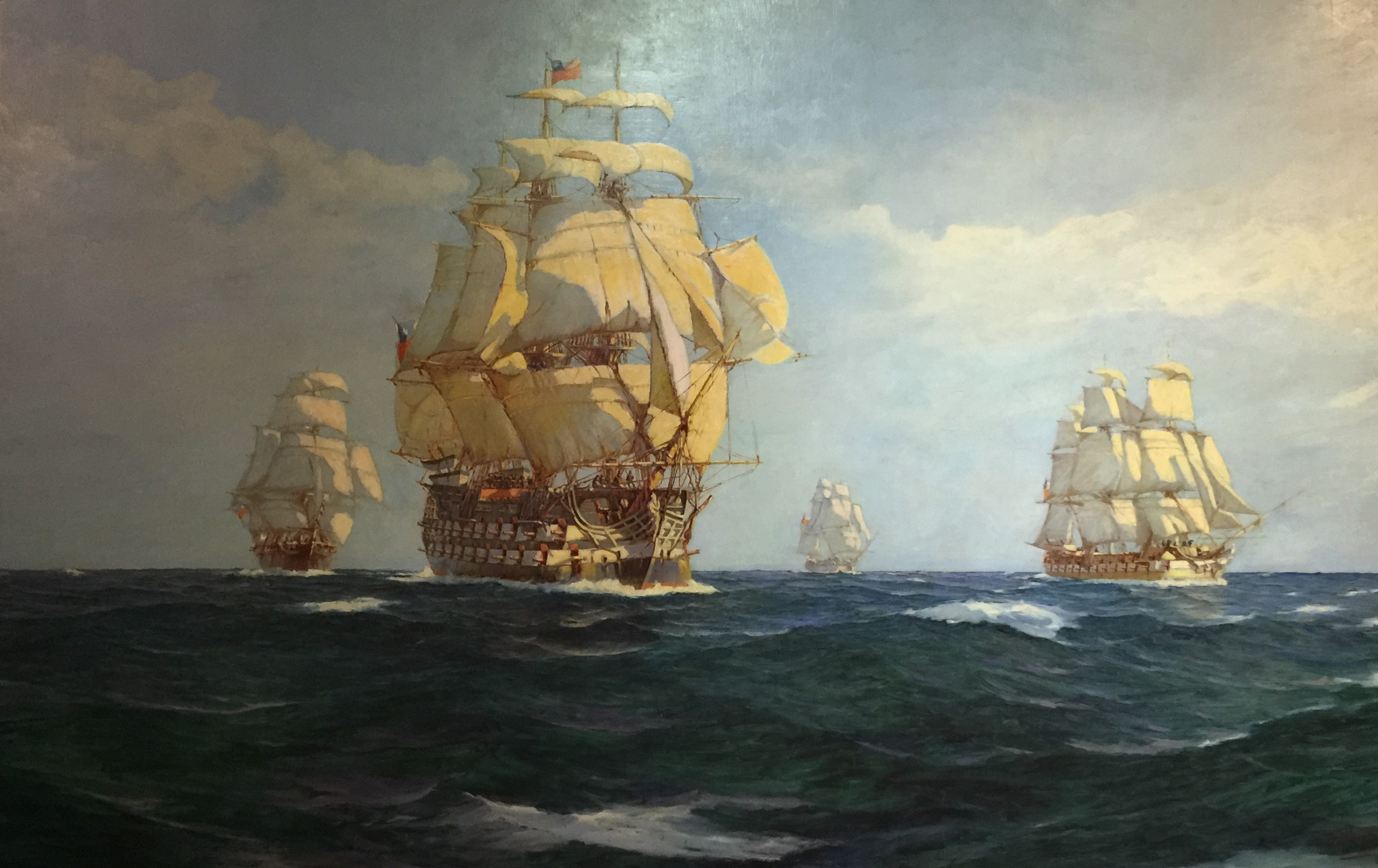
First Chilean Navy Squadron had the mission of assisting the war along the Peruvian coast

To achieve the liberation of Peru, leaders of Argentina and Chile signed a treaty on 5 February 1819 to prepare for an invasion. General José de San Martín believed that the liberation of Argentina would not be secure until the Royalist stronghold in Peru was defeated, thus moving focus to the region.

The second phase of independence (1820–1824) or of the liberating currents of America, now identified with a Fatherland (political and constructed), and its supporters identified with Sovereignty, called Patriots (but not in reference to the national territory of Peru but to America); begins with the arrival of the Liberating Expedition of José de San Martín, liberating current from the south and the emergence of the independent Peruvian state; and concludes with the arrival in Peru of Simón Bolívar, liberating current from the north and consolidation of independence, a period in which the definitive defeat of the viceroyal forces is achieved.

==== Peruvian campaign ====
The internal pacification of the Viceroyalty of Peru allowed the Viceroy to organize two expeditions against the Chilean patriots, composed of royalist regiments from Arequipa and Lima and European expeditionary battalions. In 1814, the first expedition led to the reconquest of Chile at the Battle of Rancagua. In 1817, after the patriot victory at the Battle of Chacabuco, the Royal Army of Peru was once again called upon to save the monarchy, and a second expedition departed in 1818, achieving a victory at the Battle of Cancha Rayada, but was ultimately defeated by San Martín at the Battle of Maipú.

Two years after the Battle of Maipú, and the subsequent liberation of Chile, the patriots began the preparations for an amphibious assault force to liberate Peru. Originally the costs were to be assumed by both Chile and Argentina, however the Chilean government under Bernardo O'Higgins ended up assuming most of costs of the campaign. Nonetheless, it was determined that the land army was to be commanded by José de San Martín, whilst the navy was to be commanded by admiral Thomas Alexander Cochrane.

On 21 August 1820, the Peruvian Liberation Expedition set sail from the city of Valparaíso under the Chilean flag. The expedition was composed of 4,118 soldiers. On 7 September the Liberation expedition arrived on the bay of Pisco in today's Region of Ica and captured the province by the following day. In an attempt to negotiate, the viceroy of Peru sent a letter to José de San Martín 15 September. However, negotiations broke down on 14 October with no clear result.

==== Beginning of hostilities ====
Actual hostilities began with the Sierra Campaign, led by patriot General Juan Antonio Álvarez de Arenales beginning on 5 October 1820. During this campaign, General Arenales proclaimed the independence of the city of Huamanga (Ayacucho) on 1 November 1820. This was followed by the Battle of Cerro de Pasco, where General Arenales defeated a royalist division sent by viceroy Pezuela. The rest of the liberation forces under Admiral Cochrane captured the royalist frigate Esmeralda on 9 November 1820, dealing the royalist navy a heavy blow. On 2 December 1820 the royalist battalion Voltígeros de la Guardia defected to the patriots' side. On 8 January 1821, the armed column of General Álvarez de Arenales regrouped with the rest of the expedition on the coast.

Viceroy Pezuela was ousted and replaced by General José de la Serna on 29 January 1821. In March 1821, incursions led by Miller and Cochrane attacked the royalist ports of Arica and Tacna. The new viceroy announced his departure from Lima on 5 June 1821, but ordered a garrison to resist the patriots in the Real Felipe Fortress, leading to the First siege of Callao. The royalist army under the command of General José de Canterac left Lima, and proceeded to the highlands on 25 June 1821. General Arenales was sent by General San Martín to observe the Royalist retreat. Two days after, the Liberation Expedition entered Lima. Under fear of repression and pillaging, the inhabitants of Lima begged General San Martín to occupy Lima.

==== Declaration of Independence of Peru ====
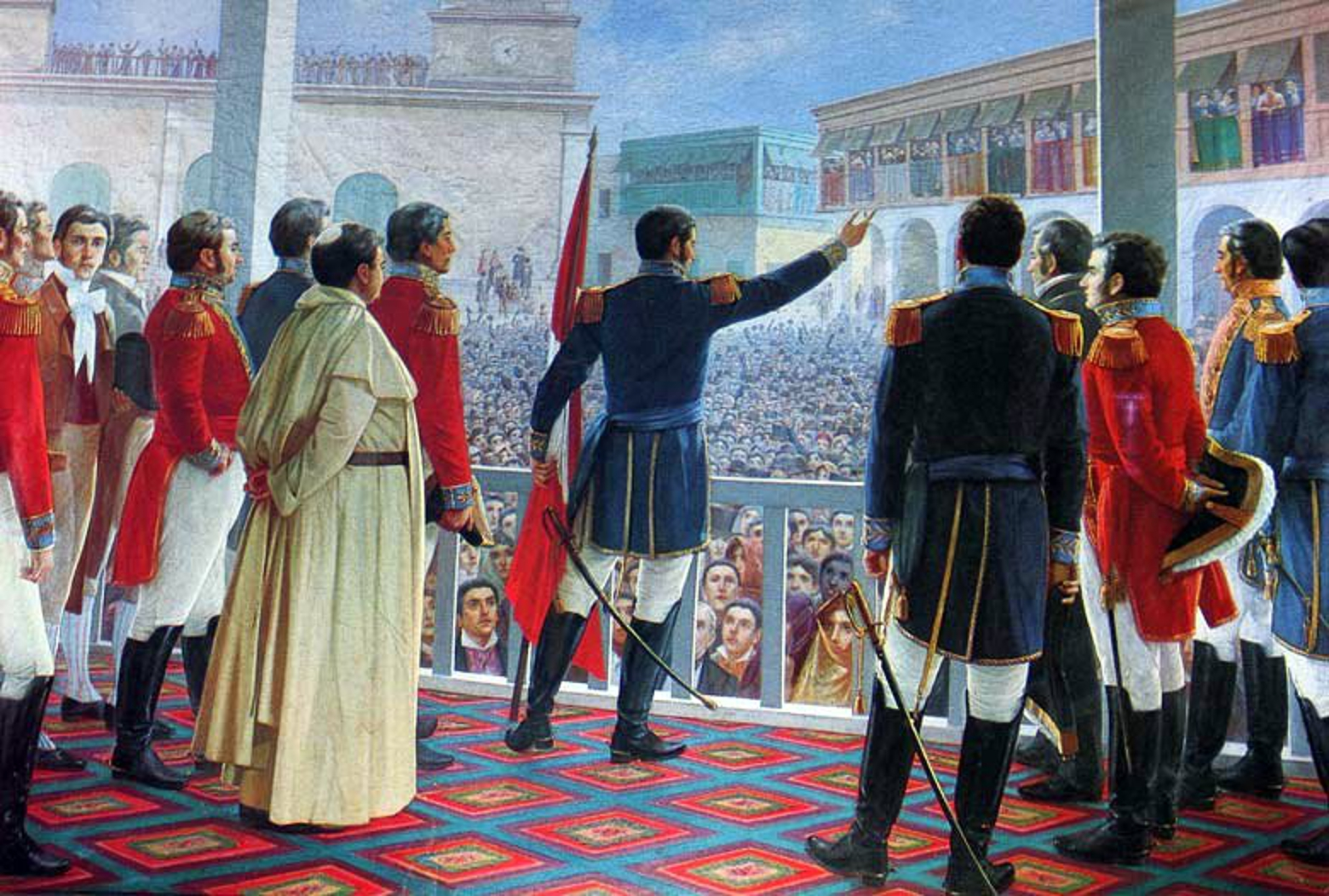
San Martín proclaims the independence of Peru. Oil painting by Juan Lepiani.

Once inside Lima, General San Martín invited all of the populace of Lima to swear an oath of allegiance to the Independence cause. The signing ceremony of the Act of Independence of Peru was held on 15 July 1821. Manuel Pérez de Tudela, later Minister of International Relations wrote the Act of Independence. Admiral Cochrane was welcomed in Lima two days later; General José de San Martín announced in the Plaza Mayor the famous declaration of independence:

DESDE ESTE MOMENTO EL PERÚ ES LIBRE E INDEPENDIENTE POR LA VOLUNTAD GENERAL DE LOS PUEBLOS Y POR LA JUSTICIA DE SU CAUSA QUE DIOS DEFIENDE. ¡VIVA LA PATRIA!, ¡VIVA LA LIBERTAD!, ¡VIVA LA INDEPENDENCIA!.

— José de San Martín. Lima, 28th of July of 1821

The state was effectively San Martins Protectorate, with the first Constituent Congress of the country was formed.

==== San Martín Abandons Peru ====
José de la Serna, moved his headquarters to Cuzco. He sent troops under the command of General Canterac which approached Lima on 10 September 1821. He failed to relief the besieged forces of General José de La Mar, in the Fortress of Real Felipe at Callao. After learning the Viceroy's new orders, he retreated to the highlands again on 16 September of the same year. The Republicans pursued the retreating Royalists until reaching Jauja on 1 October 1821. After a row with General San Martin, Admiral Cochrane left Peru on 10 May 1822, being replaced by Martin Guisse as head of the navy.

In the north, Antonio José de Sucre, in Guayaquil requested help from San Martín. He complied and sent an Auxiliary Expedition force under command of Andrés de Santa Cruz to Quito. Afterwards, during the Guayaquil Conference, San Martín and Bolívar attempted to decide the political fate of Peru. San Martín opted for a Constitutional Monarchy, whilst Simon Bolivar (Head of the Northern Expedition) opted for a Republican. Nonetheless, they both followed the notion that it was to be independent of Spain. Following the interview, General San Martin abandoned Peru for Valparaíso on 22 September 1822 and left the entire command of the Independence movement to Simon Bolivar.

In the meantime, the Peruvian state was bogged down by the Royalist resistance, and instability of the Republic itself. Hence, whilst the coast and Northern Peru was under the command of the Republic, the rest of the country was still under the control of the Royalists. In April 1822, a Royalist incursion defeated a Republican Army in the Battle of Ica. Afterwards, in January 1823 a Republican army under General Rudecindo Alvarado experienced another costly defeat at the hands of the Royalists at the Battles of Torata and Moquegua. The Royalist general José Canterac reoccupied Lima on 18 June 1823 without a fight.

=== Northern Expedition and independence (1823-1825) ===
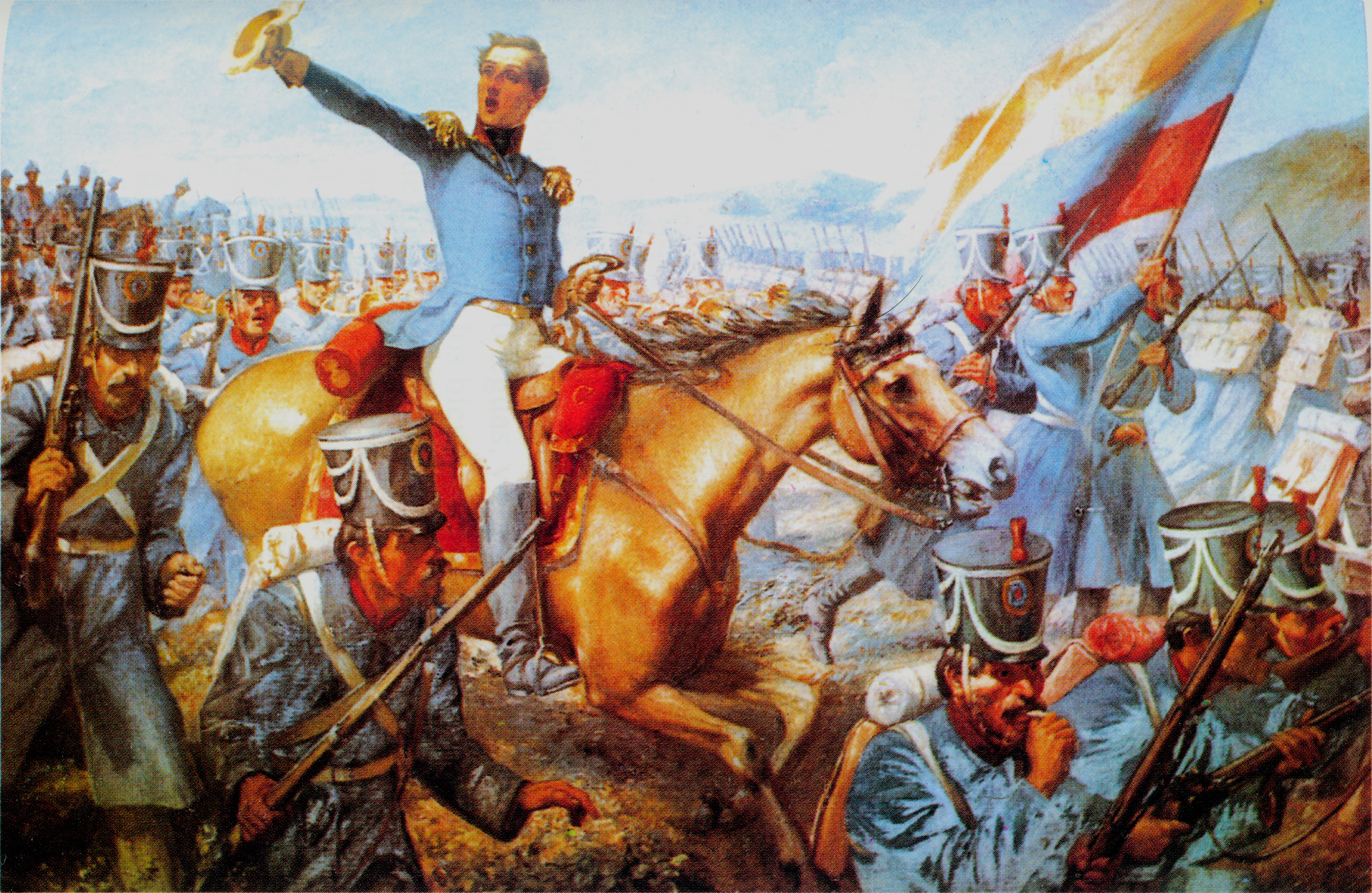
José María Córdova leading the 2nd Colombian division in the Battle of Ayacucho, painting by Francisco Antonio Cano.

The end of the war would come with the military intervention of Gran Colombia. Following the self exile of San Martin, and the constant military defeats under president José de la Riva Agüero, the congress decided to send a plea in 1823 for the help of Simón Bolívar. Bolivar arrived in Lima on 10 December 1823 with the aim of liberating all of Peru.

In 1824, an uprising in the royalist camp in Upper Peru (present-day Bolivia), would pave the way for the battles of Junín and Ayacucho, respectively under command of Bolivar and General Antonio José de Sucre. The battles of Junín and Ayacucho would be the most significant battles of the war of independence. The Battle of Ayacucho, led by Sucre and Agustín Gamarra, secured the independence of Peru and the rest of the South American states.

The campaign of Sucre in Upper Peru concluded in April 1825. The war would not end until the last royalist holdouts the Real Felipe fortress in Callao and fortifications around Chiloé would surrender in January 1826.

== Aftermath ==
The independence of Peru was an important chapter in the Hispano-American wars of independence. Spain renounced all their continental American territories ten years later in 1836 leaving very little of its vast empire intact.

Political dependence on Spain had been severed, but Peru was still economically dependent on Europe. Despite the separation from Spain, the plunder of lands from indigenous people was exacerbated in this new republican era. Indigenous domestic servants were treated inhumanely well into the 20th century. During the birth of the republic, the indigenous people obtained open citizenship in Peru, 27 August 1861.

After the war of independence, conflicts of interests that faced different sectors of the Criollo society and the particular ambitions of individual caudillos, made the organization of the country excessively difficult. Only three civilians: Manuel Pardo, Nicolás de Piérola and Francisco García Calderón would accede to the presidency in the first seventy-five years of independent life. In 1837, the Peru-Bolivian Confederation was created but it was dissolved two years later due to a combined military intervention of Peruvian patriots.

== Social consequences ==
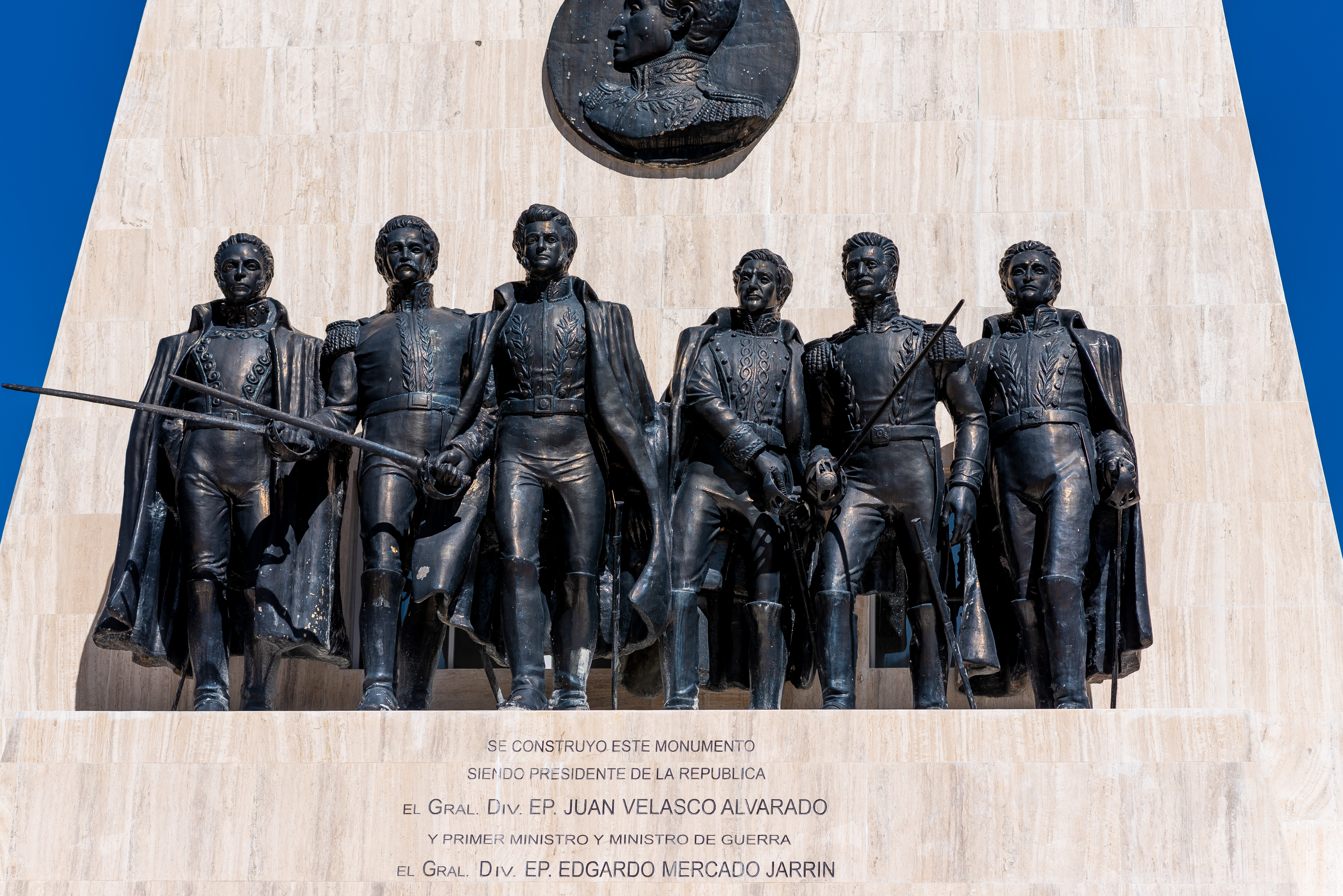
Heroes of the Battle of Ayacucho on the Pampa de Ayacucho Historic Sanctuary

The struggle for independence in 18th and 19th century Peru was a complex and multifaceted process, marked by indigenous uprisings, colonial resistance, and the emergence of strong regional identities. Against the backdrop of Spanish colonial rule, women found themselves thrust into positions of leadership and responsibility within their households as husbands fled or were absent. This period of turmoil and change not only reshaped the socio-political landscape of Peru but also underscored the resilience and adaptability of its people, particularly women, in navigating the tumultuous path towards independence. By examining the intersecting narratives of colonial resistance, indigenous uprisings, and the evolving roles of women, one could gain a deeper understanding of the dynamic forces at play in Peru's quest for autonomy and self-determination.

In the 18th century, amidst early attempts for independence from Spanish colonial rule in Peru, women faced the challenge of assuming leadership roles within their households due to the absence or flight of their husbands. As indigenous uprisings and rebellions against colonial authority erupted, women found themselves navigating newfound autonomy and responsibilities, managing finances and familial affairs independently. Despite the unrest and discontent, exacerbated by Bourbon Reforms and the Rebellion of Túpac Amaru II, Peru remained strongly royalist during the Peninsular War, with the viceroy José Fernando de Abascal y Sousa suppressing uprisings and annexing Upper Peru to the viceroyalty. Ultimately, Peru's journey towards independence was marked by the campaigns of José de San Martín and Simón Bolívar.

The results of independence were varied: politically, dependence on Spain was cut off; economically, dependence on Europe was maintained; and socially, the removal of indigenous lands was accentuated in the republican era. Indigenous domestic workers were treated inhumanely, even in the first decades of the 20th century. They received citizenship at the birth of the republic, on 27 August 1821.

== See also ==
- Royalist (Spanish American independence)
- Bolivian War of Independence
- Campaigns of the South

== Bibliography ==
- Higgins, James (editor). The Emancipation of Peru: British Eyewitness Accounts, 2014. Online at https://sites.google.com/site/jhemanperu
- Fisher, John R.; Kuethe, Allan J.; McFarlane, Anthony, eds. (1990). Reform and Insurrection in Bourbon New Granada and Peru. Baton Rouge and London: Louisiana State University Press. ISBN 080711569X.
- Anna, Timothy E. (1979). The Fall of the Royal Government in Peru. Lincoln and London: University of Nebraska Press. ISBN 0803210043.
- Walker, Charles F. (1999). Smoldering Ashes: Cuzco and the Creation of Republican Peru, 1780–1840. Durham and London: Duke University Press. ISBN 0822322935.
