= Iquicha =

Separatist state in Peru (1821–1839)

Republic of Iquicha República de Iquicha
- 1821–1839
- Flag Emblem

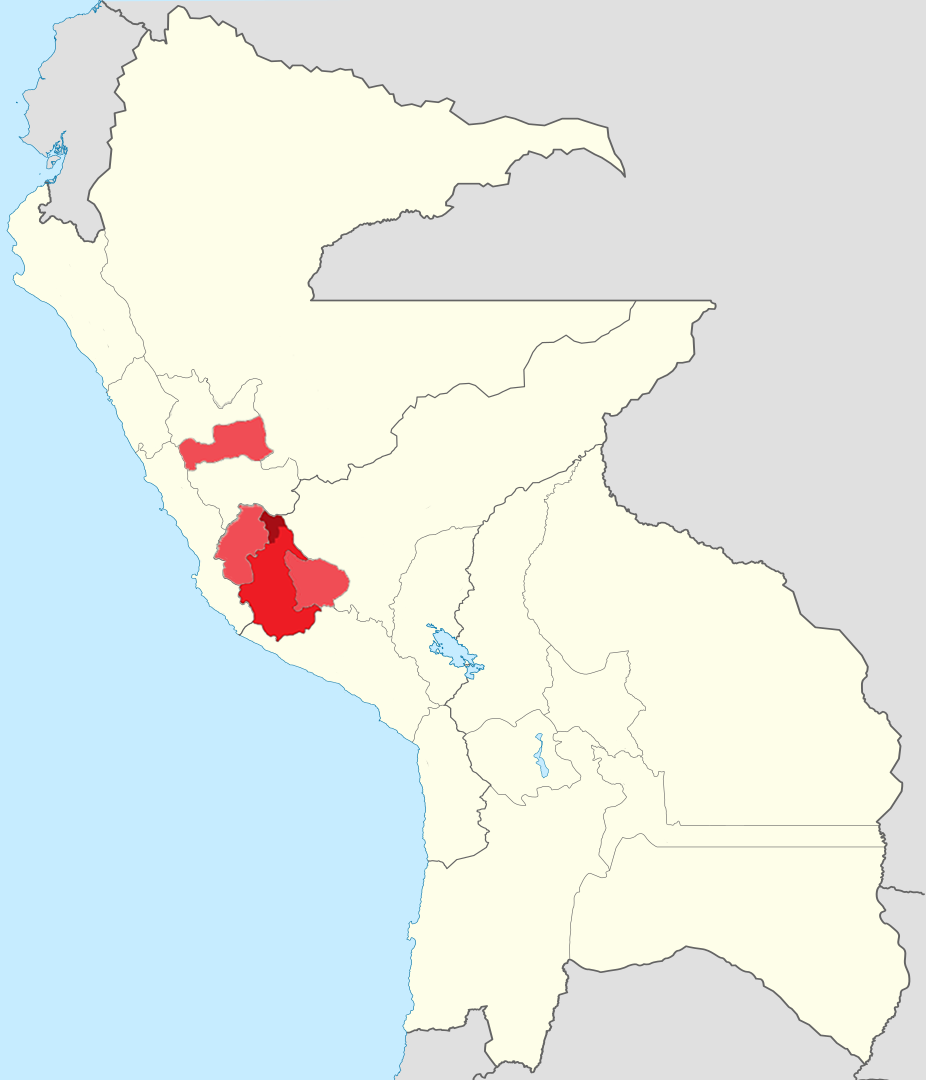
- Location of Iquicha within the Peru-Bolivian Confederation
- Status: Unrecognized state
- Capital: Callqui
- Official languages: Spanish
- Religion: Catholicism
- Demonym(s): Iquichan (Note: Spanish: Iquicheño, a; Iquichano, a)
- Government: Republiqueta
- Supreme Chief of the Republic of Iquicha (1822–1836) Justice of the Peace and Governor of Carhuaucran District (1836–1839)
  - 1821 – 1839: Antonio Huachaca
- History
  - Established: 1821
  - Disestablished: 15 November 1839
- Currency: Peruvian real
Preceded by	Succeeded by
Protectorate of Peru	Peruvian Republic
- Today part of: Peru

The Republic of Iquicha, (Note: Spanish: República de Iquicha) also known as the Republiqueta of Iquicha, (Note: Spanish: Republiqueta de Iquicha) was a republiqueta and de facto autonomous region formed in Huanta by General Antonio Huachaca, a mestizo loyal to the Spanish Empire against the newly formed Peruvian Republic. The state existed from Peru's declared independence in 1821 until its incorporation to the country on 15 November 1839.

== Background ==
The Iquichans had established themselves as warriors, fighting against the Cuzco rebellion of Túpac Amaru II in 1781, remaining faithful allies of the Spanish authorities.

In 1813, Antonio Huachaca appeared for the first time as a popular leader, leading the indigenous peasants in defiance of the orders of the local Huamanga administration in protest of the inability of the local mayor to stop the abuses of government tax collectors, since the Cadiz Constitution had abolished indigenous tribute and unpaid work. This was a direct consequence of the revolt that had affected the city of Huamanga the previous year, the promulgation of the liberal constitution and the conflicts of the liberal revolutionaries with the absolutist viceregal authorities. The Indians of Iquicha had no problem supporting both an absolutist king and the reforms of a liberal constitution since both gave them benefits.

In 1814, a rebellion broke out in Cuzco, in which the Iquichans, under Huachaca's command, decided to support the Spanish government, confronting the independentists from Cuzco, mobilizing their people against the Angulo brothers, just as they had done against Túpac Amaru II in 1780. The fighting between Iquicheños and Cuzqueños took place in September–October 1814 and January 1815, with Huachaca acting as guerrilla chief under the command of the landowner and militia commander, Pedro José Lazón, and receiving for these actions the rank of brigadier general in the Royal Army of Peru from José de la Serna.

The main action in which the Iquichans participated at that time was the successful Battle of Huanta, on 1 October 1814, when a column of 5,000 Morochucos (only 300 with rifles) with four cannons and cavalry tried to take the city. Unlike the Iquichans, prominent royalists, the Morochucos of Cangallo distinguished themselves as fierce patriots. As a reward for their loyalty, the king ordered a shield of their own for their community.

== History ==
=== War with Peru ===
Between 1825 and 1828, the forces of the newly formed Peruvian Republic and the Iquichan royalists of Huanta clashed. The first uprisings occurred in March and December 1825, but they were easily subdued by the huge contingent of the Peruvian army that was in the area. In January 1826, the Peruvian prefect of the area, General Juan Pardo de Zela y Vidal, organized a punitive expedition, which only managed to harden their resistance.

With the republican army dispersed throughout Peru, on 5 June 1826, the rebels attacked Huanta, under the command of Huachaca and the former soldier and then Spanish merchant Nicolás Soregui (or Zoregui). Shortly after, on 6 July, two regiments of the Hussars of Junín stationed in Huancayo mutinied and united the rebels, encouraging them to assault Ayacucho. Eventually they were repelled by the local garrison.

A third uprising took place at the beginning of October 1827, where Huachaca once again mobilized the population in favor of the Spanish king. On 12 November, Huachaca's forces came out of the mountains and attacked Huanta. Of the 175 defenders of the Pichincha battalion, commanded by Sergeant Major Narciso Tudela, 10 to 12 died and managed to escape to Ayacucho in scattered groups of 80 or 90. Sixty attackers fell in combat. Most of the inhabitants remained in the city without major problems, although many were those who escaped. The days 22 to 24 were of negotiations between both sides that did not lead to anything.

On 29 November, 300 line shooters, 100 government prisoners who changed sides, and 400 Iquichans with spears and rejones again launched themselves against Ayacucho, whose defense was led by Prefect Domingo Tristán with 100 soldiers armed with rifles and a small cannon. They were two companies from the Nr. 8 Battalion commanded by Colonel Juan Francisco de Vidal. The prefect had sent three priests to Huanta to try to appease them, sent Chiara a proclamation to recruit Morochucos and awaited 250 rifles from Lima. To support his one hundred soldiers, he recruited militiamen aged 15 to 50 years, soon bringing together about 2,300 men, but not all participated in the defense. Huachaca arrived through Mollepata with 100 line shooters and many armed Indians, but the Morochucos came down from La Picota through Quebrada Honda to threaten the Iquichan rearguard, the right wing was also flanked by Huatatas and Colonel Vidal was in command of the militias in the center.

Tristán had prepared well and was able to repel the attackers and pursue them to the Mollepata hill and the Honda ravine, where he defeated them on the 30th. The Iquichans had 300 dead and 64 prisoners. Once again the "peasant war" proved incapable of taking over a city, being relegated to its "rurality." The taking of the provincial capital was key, he could "transform this peasant war into a civil war" because his plans included taking over Ayacucho to cut off communications between Cuzco and Lima and isolate southern Peru. All while awaiting troops from the Holy Alliance and Spain. Then they hoped to stir up Huancavelica, Ica, Aymaraes and Cerro de Pasco in their favor to form a great army with which to recover Peru for its king. Shortly after the combat, General Francisco de Paula Otero arrived with 300 soldiers from Lima. On 12 December, the republican troops recovered Huanta.

The "pacification" phase known as the War of the Punas came under the command of General Otero. A great battle was fought in Uchuraccay, on 25 March 1828, when the commander of the civic battalions, Gabriel Quintanilla, stormed the Huachaca barracks. Twenty-one guerrillas fell in the confrontation, including Sergeant Major Pedro Cárdenas and the caudillo's brother, Prudencio Huachaca. Another 24 were taken prisoner. At the beginning of May the last combat took place in Ccano in the current District of Huanta, in the heart of the punas region; Colonel Vidal defeated the Montoneros definitively. On 8 June, in an armed action in the middle of the jungle, almost all the royalist leaders were captured. The war was ended definitely. As a result, Huachaca was forced to take refuge in Apurímac.

The Bourbon Reforms implied the closure of many missions, necessarily leading to the loss of control of vast jungle regions of the Apurímac valley. The liberalism of the periods 1808-1814 and 1820-1823 and Bolívar's revolutionaries only led to a deepening of this situation. On 1 November 1824, the closure of the Franciscan convent Santa Rosa de Ocapa was ordered. This would prove to be a bad decision, as the Iquicha guerrillas managed to resist for years thanks to finding refuge in the low jungles to the east of the highlands, areas only accessible by the Mantaro and Apurímac, territories outside of state control. There would be no new impulses of "assimilation and/or Peruvianization" towards the extensive eastern areas until the governments of Ramón Castilla. According to the Peruvian historian Cecilia Méndez Gastelumendi, the term Iquichano went from being used to refer to all the Indians in the region who participated in the revolt (thanks to the royalist propaganda pasquinades) to a symbol of collective pride.

=== Role in the Peruvian Civil War of 1834 ===
In the Peruvian civil war of 1834, they supported the liberal president Luis José de Orbegoso against the coup of the conservative generals Pedro Pablo Bermúdez and Agustín Gamarra, a key figure in politics of the time, and an enemy of the republiqueta. During his presidency, Gamarra had favored the merchants of Lima and neglected the rest of the country, especially the rural areas and their population.

After defeating the revolt in the capital, Orbegoso had to face Gamarra in the southern highlands of the country seeking an alliance with the inhabitants of Huanta. The liberals mobilized an army of 4,000 Indians under the command of landowner Juan José Urbina, who knew how to unify under his command Republicans and monarchists. He had to face the conservatives, who mobilized four to five thousand combatants in the area. In April he seized Huanta and Huamanga, and a month later the civil war ended with the victory of the Liberals.

=== Support for the Peru–Bolivian Confederation ===
In 1836, the Iquichianos adhered to the idea of the Peru-Bolivian Confederation seen as "the continuation of the Empire by other means", for which Huachaca participated in the wars of the Confederation between 1836 and 1839. In 1838 Huachaca became Justice of the Peace and Governor of the Carhuaucra district and Supreme Chief of the Republic of Iquicha.

The Iquichans first supported the Confederation in their support of Andrés de Santa Cruz during the Salaverry-Santa Cruz War, since "he came to respond to the demands of the southern Andean groups who, since at least 1814, have defended a more decentralized country, in which they take into account the interests of the regional elites against the centralist coastal hegemonic groups." In March 1839 he took up arms against the Restoration Army and put Huanta under siege to no avail. Finally tired of the conflict, after several confrontations, the Yanallay Treaty was signed on 15 November between the prefect of Ayacucho, Colonel Manuel Lopera, and the guerrilla Tadeo Choque (or Chocce). The Iquichans decide to recognize and submit to the Peruvian State. Huachaca refuses to participate in that agreement and retires to the Apurímac jungles, where he would later die in 1848. By 1838, the authorities used the expression republiqueta to refer to the territories under the control of Huachaca.

=== Role against the United Restoration Army ===
In 1839, when the Peru-Bolivian Confederation was defeated by the United Restoration Army, by March of the same year, General Huachaca and the Iquichans were once again in arms against a Creole "restoration", now supported by foreign bayonets. For this reason, the Catholic Army once again besieges Huanta, which was occupied by the Chilean “Cazadores” battalion. Faced with this serious situation, the prefect of Ayacucho, Colonel Lopera, sent reinforcements to the Chilean “Valdivia” battalion, which broke the siege and began an expedition in the highlands against the republiqueta. In June 1839, the Battle of Campamento-Oroco took place, where General Huachaca surprised the expeditionaries and, in the midst of a storm, forced them to a disastrous retreat. The republican contingent, to avenge the humiliation inflicted: "[...] carried out a real slaughter of men —without distinguishing the elderly, children or women— and of cattle." Some 2,000 people died as a result.

In this context, on 15 November 1839, the general commander of the Peruvian government Manuel Lopera led an agreement with the Iquicha forces to find a negotiated solution to the conflict, for which the Treaty of Yanallay was signed, in the Yanallay plateau of Huanta; between Lopera and the Iquichan commander Tadeo Choqe, representing the great caudillo General José Antonio Navala Huachaca, who after 18 years of having proclaimed the Independence of Peru, formally committed to lay down their arms forever against the Peruvian government and to respect the laws of the nation. Thus, with a peace treaty, and not with a surrender, the Iquicha War ended. The Iquichan resistance was ending, which was supported by his leader, who left the following consigned in the document:

"Rather, you are the usurpers of Religion, Crown and Homeland [...] What has been obtained from you during your rule? Tyranny, grief, and ruin in a Kingdom that was so generous. What inhabitant, rich or poor, does not complain today? Where is the responsibility for the crimes? We do not carry such a tyranny."

— Antonio Huachaca

Huachaca, before admitting defeat, preferred to enter the Apurimac jungle before yielding his monarchism to those he believed to be republican “antichrists”. There he lived until his death in 1848, being buried in the church of his native San José de Iquicha.
