= Domingo Tristán =

Mayor of Arequipa
- In office 1800–1801
- Preceded by: Col. José Mariano Morante
- Succeeded by: Manuel de Benavides y Vilchez
- In office 1809–1810
- Preceded by: José Manuel de Goyeneche
- Succeeded by: Bernardo Bustamante

Personal details
- Born: July 27, 1768 Arequipa, Peru
- Died: 8 August 1847 (aged 79) Arequipa, Peru
- Relatives: Flora Tristan (niece); Pío de Tristán (brother)
- Occupation: Politician, general

Military service
- Allegiance: Spain
- Branch/service: c. 1783–1822
- Rank: General
- Battles/wars: Battle of Ica; 1st Iquicha War

Domingo Pantaleón Tristan y Moscoso was a Peruvian general and politician.

== Biography ==
Tristán was born in Arequipa on 27 July 1768. His parents were José Joaquín Tristán del Pozo y Carassa Musquiz (Corregidor de Omasuyos) and María Mercedes Moscoso Pérez-Oblitas, members of the Arequipa Creole high society. Among his brothers were Pío de Tristán, last viceroy of Peru, and Mariano Tristán - father of Flora Tristan. He studied in the city of Cuzco. He was later sent by his parents to Spain where he served in the royal Guardia de Corps.

In 1791 Tristán returned to Peru with the title of lieutenant colonel of the Majes Valley militia, and that same year married the widow of the maternal uncle of José Manuel de Goyeneche. Tristán was age 23.

Tristán quickly rose to the rank of militia colonel (1793), and alcalde of Arequipa (1801). Also in 1801, Tristán was present for the wedding of his step-daughter Francisca Xaviera Barreda and Clemente Diez de Medina Parada (March 15, 1801), and then god-father to their child (December 29, 1801). Clemente Diez de Medina later returned to his hometown of La Paz, and actively participated in the uprising of 1809.

In 1809 Tristán was part of the Arequipa-Cusco-Puno army under the command of his 3rd cousin (once removed), General José Manuel de Goyeneche, against the Juntistas of Upper Peru. He chased the retreating insurgents to Yungay, defeating in Irupana the caudillo and regidor (el 24), Manuel Victorio García-Lanza and the Spaniard Gabriel Antonio Castro. Their severed heads were displayed in November 1809 in the town of Chulumani. Clemente Diez de Medina escaped capture.

For his service, Tristán was appointed the royal governor (Intendente) of La Paz (November 1810 to June 1813).

When the rebel Army of the North advanced towards Potosí, and with a fast approaching cavalry army arriving from Cochabamba, Governor Tristán signed the act of adhesion to the government of Buenos Aires on 16 November 1810. Three days later, Tristán issued in La Paz a patriotic proclamation of independence. Tristán, his secretary Jose Martin Echenique, and Clemente Diez de Medina, all actively supported the armed insurgency against the royal army led by Goyeneche and Tristán's own brother (Pio).

After the defeat of the Army of the North in the Battle of Huaqui, General Goyeneche quietly pardoned him. Tristán remained in his position as governor of La Paz until the eve of the arrival of the Marqués de Valdehoyos in June 1813. Beloved by the residents of La Paz, Tristán returned a hero to Arequipa, where he celebrated the marriage of his daughter Angela (August 20, 1813) with the son of Antonio Rivero y Aranibar (subdelegado of Arica). Meanwhile in La Paz, the Marqués de Valdehoyos began a secret investigation, uncovered his disloyal conduct, and reported to the Viceroy of Peru.

In 1813, Tristán was elected a representative (diputado) to the Cortes of Cádiz for Arequipa. Viceroy José Fernando de Abascal harshly criticized the election, and believed this resulted from the vote of the seditious, the audacious and the schemers. Tristán set sail for Spain to take up his position. En route, Tristán received news while in Panama of the return of King Ferdinand VII and the dissolution of the Cortes of Cádiz. Tristán returned to Peru, and arrived back in Arequipa sometime after the Cusco Rebellion (1814-1815).

In 1821, after the landing of the Liberating expedition of San Martín and the successful expedition throughout the territory of Arequipa by Lord Cochrane and Guillermo Miller, Tristán left the safety of the Mages Valley and travelled to Lima to present himself to the ranks of the Patriot army. San Martín entrusted Tristán with the command of a division of an all-Peruvian army to begin the liberation of the interior of Peru. The patriot officer corp included the former royalist officer Agustin Gamarra (Cusco), Juan Bautista Elespuru (Tacna), Antonio de la Fuente Gutierrez (Tarapaca), Jose Santiago Aldunate (Santiago), Juan Pardo de Zela (Spaniard), Ramon Echenique (Valparaiso - but long-time resident of Puno), and most likely, Anselmo Quiros y Nieto (Arequipa). The battle for Peruvian independence was to be won by a Peruvian army - led by a Peruvian general. And the honor of leading this Peruvian army was bestowed to the 53-year old, General Tristán.

The campaign was a complete disaster. After reaching Pisco from Lima by foot, Tristan’s forces advanced only as far Ica. With the news of General Jeronimo Valdez marching north from Chuquibamba (Arequipa) and General José de Canterac advancing from Jauja, Tristán decided to withdraw back to Pisco. Anticipating Tristán’s retreat, Canterac positioned his forces at the hacienda Macacona, along the road from Ica to Pisco. In the early morning of April 7, 1822, Canterac destroyed Tristan’s retreating army, as well as the patriot reinforcements from Chincha. The battle was no contest. Canterac, a superb military officer, battle-hardened from the Napoleonic Wars, led a disciplined and formidable fighting force. Tristan was a militia officer, who had never faced a professional army. Canterac seized the moment, as well as all of the patriot provisions - including rifles and ammunition - that sustained the royalist cause and provided a much needed morale boost. For the patriots in Lima, the momentum, and the moment, was lost.

Tristan escaped back to Lima, where he was tried by a patriot military tribunal. Although acquitted, Tristán would never again lead a military command. Less than 4 months after Tristan’s disastrous defeat, San Martin resigned after the Guayaquil Conference on July 26, 1822. The hope of a Peruvian victory for independence vanished, and now rested with the Colombians.

In 1827 - after the waning of Colombian influence - Tristán was appointed governor (prefecto) of Ayacucho and commanded the repression of the Royalist rebels from Iquicha who had risen up against the republican authorities. In 1834 he took the side of President Luis José de Orbegoso against the rebellion of Generals Agustín Gamarra and Pedro Pablo Bermúdez. Retired from active service, he died in Arequipa in 1847 at the age of 79.

== See also ==
- Tristán family:
  - Pío de Tristán
  - Flora Tristán
  - Victoria Tristán, wife of President of Peru José Rufino Echenique
