= Santillana District =

Coordinates: 12.7655°S 74.2579°W

Santillana
- District
- Interactive map of Santillana
- Country: Peru
- Region: Ayacucho
- Province: Huanta
- Founded: December 21, 1918
- Capital: San José de Secce

Government
  - Mayor: Renol Silbio Pichardo Ramos

Area
  - Total: 902.1 km^{2} (348.3 sq mi)
- Elevation: 3,262 m (10,702 ft)

Population (2005 census)
  - Total: 7,305
  - Density: 8.098/km^{2} (20.97/sq mi)
- Time zone: UTC-5 (PET)
- UBIGEO: 050406

Santillana District is one of eight districts of the Huanta Province in Peru.

== Geography ==
One of the highest peaks of the district is Quri Willka at approximately 4,400 m (14,400 ft). Other mountains are listed below:

- Anta Qaqa
- Chaka Urqu
- Chawpi Urqu
- Chikuruyuq Urqu
- Chuqi Wiska
- Ichhu Runtuna
- Ichik Puka Wayq'u
- Isku Urqu
- Kisu Rumi
- Lank'u Urqu
- Muyuq Urqu
- Puka Mach'ay
- Puka Q'asa
- Punta Urqu
- Purus Urqu
- Qarwa Qaqa
- Q'illu Q'asa
- Q'illu Waytayuq
- Raqraq Q'asa Punta
- Runtu Muqu
- Saqsa Willka
- Sinwa Q'asa
- Uchpa Q'asa
- Wachu Qaqa
- Wachu Qucha

== Ethnic groups ==
The people in the district are mainly indigenous citizens of Quechua descent. Quechua is the language which the majority of the population (96.75%) learnt to speak in childhood, 2.98% of the residents started speaking using the Spanish language (2007 Peru Census).
