= Huanta =

Huanta Wanta
- Town
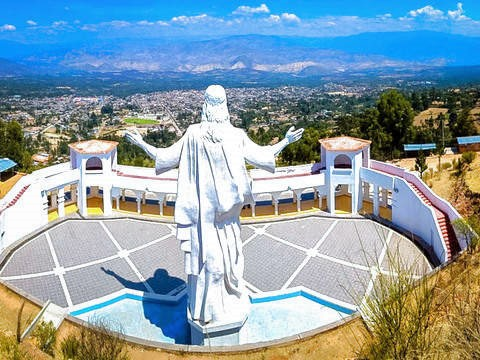
- Sagrado Corazón Convent, Huanta

- Flag Seal
- Nickname: La Esmeralda de los Andes / The Emerald of the Andes
- Location within Peru
- Coordinates: 12°56′23″S 74°14′51″W
- Country: Peru
- Region: Ayacucho
- Province: Huanta
- District: Huanta
- Demonym: Huantino
- City Established: November 22, 1905

Government
  - Mayor: Renol Silbio Pichardo Ramos
- Elevation: 2,628 m (8,622 ft)

Population
  - Estimate (2015): 35,429
- Time zone: UTC-5 (PET)
- Website: www.munihuanta.gob.pe

Huanta is a town in Central Peru, capital of the province Huanta in the region Ayacucho.

== History ==
In the era of the Spanish American wars of independence, Huanta remained loyal to the Spanish monarch Ferdinand VII and the viceroy of Peru designated it the "Loyal and Invincible Villa of Huanta", a source of pride for the residents. Huanta and the province was the site of a major rebellion (1825–28) against the newly formed Peruvian state. The Huanta Rebellion, characterized as a monarchist rebellion, brought together different ethnic and occupational groups in complex interactions. The peasants of Huanta were originally monarchist rebels and were transformed into liberal guerrillas. Although the rebels were largely illiterate and considered passive and reactionary, recent research argues that they had a clear vision of national politics. The Huanta rebellion was defeated militarily, but the local leaders did not suffer the severe repression that characterized earlier rebellions, most notably the Rebellion of Túpac Amaru II. Other conflicts in Huanta include the Salt Tax Revolt (1896–1897) and the Huanta Rebellion (1969).
