= Second Intermedios campaign =

Military campaign of the Peruvian War of Independence

- Part of the Peruvian War of Independence
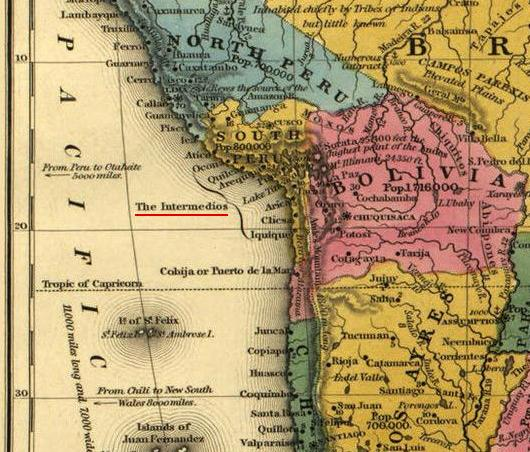
- 1839 map of the "Intermedios"
Date	May–October 1823
Location	The "Intermedios": Ocoña; Quilca; Arica; Clicsa; Iquique; and Upper Peru
Result	Royalist victory

Belligerents
Peru	Spain

Commanders and leaders
Andrés Santa Cruz	Gerónimo Valdés

Units involved
United Liberating Army	Royalist Army

The Second Intermedios Campaign (Spanish: Segunda Campaña de Intermedios) was a phase of the Independence of Peru that occurred between May and October 1823. Returning to the plan of the First Intermedios campaign, the Peruvian Army, under the command of General Andrés de Santa Cruz, landed in the so-called "intermediate ports" of southern Peru and entered into Upper Peru (present-day Bolivia), a region dominated by royalist forces under the command of viceroy José de la Serna. After the indecisive battle of Zepita and a campaign described as "no better than the first," the patriots were overwhelmed by the massive royalist attack and retreated to the coast, with the survivors barely managing to embark.

== Background ==
Since February 28, 1823, President José de la Riva-Agüero ruled in Peru, appointed by the Constituent Congress after the dissolution of the Supreme Government Junta. The new government's primary task was to put an end to the War of Independence, since the Spanish still dominated central and southern Peru.

José de la Riva Agüero displayed prodigious activity, managing within two months to organize a national army of more than 5,000 men, ready to enter the campaign. For the first time, Peru had an army made up almost entirely of Peruvian leaders and soldiers. Riva Agüero proposed to carry out the attack plan from the so-called "intermediate ports" of the south, since he considered that it was good, and that the failure of the previous campaign was due to the slowness with which the operations were developed and the wrong decisions. He also wanted to complete the war of independence without the help of foreign forces, that is, Simón Bolívar and the Colombians.

The expedition was placed under the command of General Andrés de Santa Cruz, with General Agustín Gamarra as chief of staff and Rear Admiral Martin George Guisse as squad leader. He embarked in Callao between May 14 and 25, 1823 and sailed south.

Bolívar had strongly supported the expedition. In two letters to Francisco de Paula Santander and Bartolomé Salom dated May 14 and 21, 1823 respectively, he wrote that while José de Canterac was in Jauja with 6,000 men, 2,000 royalists remained garrisoning the ports. The Republicans could send 5,000 soldiers to Santa Cruz while 6,000 could remain protecting Lima. The Liberator hoped that Gerónimo Valdés and Pedro Antonio Olañeta could gather a maximum of 3,000 monarchists to confront them at the Desaguadero River.

The Royal Army of Peru fluctuated between fifteen and sixteen thousand part-time soldiers and militiamen after Torata and Moquegua. Olañeta had 1,500 men in Upper Peru, José Carratalá 1,500 in Arequipa and Puno, Canterac 9,000 in Huancayo and Jauja; It was expected that Valdés would occupy Lima with the Burgos, Gerona and Centro battalions and the Granaderos a Caballo squadron, a total of 3,000 soldiers. The garrisons on the coast numbered barely 1,000 combatants. During the Republican expedition, specifically in July, Viceroy La Serna will be forced to ask Canterac to order Valdés to return with 2,500 soldiers, something not expected by Antonio José de Sucre when devising the campaign. The Venezuelan organized a division of 3,215 veterans, including Chilean auxiliaries brought by Francisco Antonio Pinto, to reinforce Santa Cruz.

Commander-in-chief

- General Andrés de Santa Cruz

Units and commanders
Infantry:

- No. 1 Battalion of the Peruvian Legion, Colonel Cerdeña
- 1st Line Infantry Battalion, Colonel Juan Bautista Eléspuru
- 2nd Line Infantry Battalion, Lieutenant Colonel Garzón
- 4th Line Infantry Battalion, Colonel Juan Pardo de Zela y Vidal
- 5th Line Infantry Battalion, Colonel José María de la Fuente y Mesía, marquess of San Miguel de Híjar

Cavalry:

- Hussar Regiment of the Peruvian Legion, Colonel Federico de Brandsen
- Lancer Squadron, Colonel Antonio Placencia Romero

Artillery:

- 8 Artillery pieces, Lieutenant Colonel Morla

The troops were made up of a disciplined force of 5,092 to 5,369 officers and soldiers grouped in the aforementioned 7 battalions of infantry, 5 squadrons of horsemen, an artillery brigade and 8 cannons. The beginning of the expedition was delayed, as it was expected to increase the troop to 7,000 soldiers with Chilean reinforcements, but since these did not arrive, it was finally decided to launch it with the nearly 5,000 soldiers they had.

== Campaign ==
The expeditionary forces began the journey to the intermediate ports from May 1 to 14, occupying and landing in Iquique and Pacocha. On June 15, the naval squadron under the command of Martin George Guisse and 400 men under the command of Colonel Elespuru occupied Arica, shortly after Tacna and Moquegua were occupied, points where they remained for a long time, with which the surprise factor was lost. Only in July, the patriots, divided into two groups, advanced to Upper Peru: on August 8, Santa Cruz occupied La Paz and on August 9, Gamarra did the same with Oruro.

Alarmed by the patriot advance, Viceroy La Serna urgently called General Gerónimo Valdés, who was then near Lima, a city that had been occupied by the royalists during the period of a month, between June and July 1823. Valdés, which was characterized by the speed of its movements ("Valdés has wings on its feet," it was said), arrived in Upper Peru in less than a month and met with the viceroy's forces; Other royalist forces from Puno and Arequipa joined them.

=== Situation in Lima ===
While this campaign was developing, important events were happening in the rest of Peru. As a consequence of the almost non-existent military defense of Lima, 9,000 royalists under the command of General José de Canterac took the capital on June 18, 1823, which triggered a social readjustment to the new situation that became a political crisis. Part of the Congress went over to the royalist side, as did the Creole elite who had not had direct participation in the signing of the independence act, while some ten thousand people left the city fearing reprisals from the royalist side.

President Riva Agüero moved the headquarters of his government to Callao; At that time, said president was already in open dispute with Congress. Given the critical situation, the parliamentarians ordered the transfer to Trujillo of the two powers of the State, that is, the Executive and the Legislative; They also created a Military Power that they entrusted to the Venezuelan General Antonio José de Sucre (who had arrived in Peru in May of that year at the head of Colombian auxiliary troops), and accredited a delegation to request the personal collaboration of Simón Bolívar in the war against the Spaniards (June 19, 1823). Immediately, the same Congress granted Sucre powers equal to those of the President of the Republic for the duration of the crisis, and on June 23, it ruled that Riva Agüero was exonerated from supreme command.

Riva Agüero did not comply with this provision and embarked to Trujillo with part of the authorities. He maintained his investiture as president, decreed the dissolution of Congress and created a Senate made up of ten deputies. Meanwhile, on July 16, Canterac withdrew from Lima, and the capital was immediately occupied by the independents. The Congress met again in Lima and appointed José Bernardo de Tagle as President of the Republic, on August 16.

=== Sucre expedition ===
Antonio José de Sucre saw fit to help the Santa Cruz Campaign as quickly as possible, so, in command of 3,000 Colombians and accompanied by Guillermo Miller, he left Lima on July 20, occupying Arequipa on August 31, then attempted to unite with the Santa Cruz division but could not.

=== Battle of Zepita ===
The only important encounter of this campaign was the battle of Zepita, fought on August 25, 1823, on the shores of Lake Titicaca, where Santa Cruz initially managed to defeat Valdés, but was unable to take advantage of this circumstance, allowing the royalist leader to retreat.

Although Santa Cruz inflicted greater casualties on his opponents and demoralized his cavalry militarily, it was an indecisive battle where neither side managed to obtain a decisive advantage, even so Santa Cruz was named Marshal of Zepita by the Peruvian government.

=== Retreat to the coast ===
Santa Cruz continued his march in search of Gamarra, whom he finally met in Panduro; In total, the patriot army numbered 7,000 troops. Meanwhile, La Serna joined forces with General Pedro Antonio Olañeta and pursued Santa Cruz. The cavalries of both sides faced each other in Sicasica and Ayo Ayo, but Santa Cruz, despite the insistence of his people, did not want to present a decisive battle and ordered the withdrawal of his troops; It is said that he made such a decision when he found himself at a disadvantage.

Santa Cruz thus began a long and painful retreat towards the coast, waiting for a reinforcement expedition from Chile that would tip the balance again in his favor; However, this expedition would arrive too late and return to Chile without landing in Peruvian territory.

In this series of marches and countermarchs the patriots lost a large number of men and equipment, so much so that when they reached the port of Ilo, Santa Cruz had only 800 infantry and 300 cavalry. To make the situation worse, the Peruvian cavalry that had distinguished itself so much in Zepita was captured on the high seas by a royalist ship. Among the prisoners were Colonel José María de la Fuente y Mesía, a Creole nobleman who had joined San Martín as soon as he landed in Paracas, the hussar commander Luis Soulanges, a prominent French officer at the service of the patriot cause, and many young Peruvian officers of the Lima aristocracy, who perished when the ship sank in which they were taken prisoners to the islands of Chiloé, then under royalist control.

=== Battle of Arequipa ===
Antonio de Sucre was defeated in the Battle of Arequipa on October 8 and had to reembark towards Lima that same day.

The Spanish called this war the "Heel Campaign", because according to them they limited themselves to pursuing Santa Cruz, almost "on his heels", without him daring to confront them. The second campaign thus ended in failure for the patriots, just like the first campaign. Before leaving, Santa Cruz had promised Congress to return triumphant or die in the campaign, but he neither triumphed nor died.

== Aftermath ==
This campaign, like its predecessor, had great political repercussions; anarchy spread in Peru as two governments existed at the same time: Riva Agüero in Trujillo and Torre Tagle in Lima. Added to this, the failure of the campaign created the perfect environment for, at the unanimous request of the population, the intervention of Bolívar and his Colombian Army to take place, seen as the only one that could save Peru.

The following year the Callao mutiny would take place and Lima would be occupied again by the royalists on February 29, 1824. Likewise, after the campaign, the royalist forces were reorganized into the so-called "Northern Army" under the command of Canterac and the "Army of the South" under the command of Gerónimo Valdez. In this last army Pedro Antonio de Olañeta was subordinate, much to his displeasure. This contributed to the rebellion Olañeta carried out in Upper Peru against Viceroy de la Serna on January 22, 1824.

== See also ==
- Peruvian War of Independence
- First Intermedios campaign
