= Supreme Governing Junta =

Governing institution of Peru

Supreme Governing Junta Suprema Junta Gubernativa
- 1822–1823
- Flag Coat of arms

- Capital: Lima
- Common languages: Spanish
- Religion: Catholicism
- Government: Military junta
- President of the Junta
  - 1822–1823: José de la Mar
- Members of the Junta
  - 1822–1823: Manuel Salazar
  - 1822–1823: Felipe Alvarado
- Legislature: Constituent Congress of Peru
- History
  - Established: 20 July 1822
  - First Intermedios campaign: October 1822–January 1823
  - Balconcillo mutiny: 27 February 1823
- Currency: Peruvian real
Preceded by	Succeeded by
Protectorate of Peru	Peruvian Republic

The Supreme Governing Junta (Spanish: Suprema Junta Gubernativa), also known as the Supreme Governing Junta of Peru (Spanish: Suprema Junta Gubernativa del Perú), was the military junta that governed Peru as the country's executive power after José de San Martín renounced his title of Protector of Peru in September of 1822. It was created on July 20, 1822, by the country's Constituent Congress.

Its members—José de La Mar (president of the Junta), Felipe Antonio Alvarado and Manuel Salazar y Baquíjano—were chosen from among the deputies of the same Congress. Its primary mission was to end the War of Independence, since the royalist forces under the command of Viceroy of Peru José de la Serna were still resisting in southern and central Peru. This was carried out through the First Intermedios campaign that lasted from October 1822 to January 1823, in which the United Liberating Army, headed by General Rudecindo Alvarado, was defeated in two battles: those of Torata in January 19, and of Moquegua in January 21.

After the failed military campaign against Serna's forces, the military leaders of the Peruvian Army garrisoned in Lima rose up against the Junta and the Congress in what became known as the Balconcillo mutiny, the first coup d'état in the history of Peru.

== See also ==
- History of Peru (1821–1842)
- Constituent Congress of Peru, 1822
