= Protectorate of San Martín =

Polity created in 1821 after Peru's declaration of independence

Regime of Free Departments Régimen de los Departamentos Libres (Spanish)
- 1821–1822
- Flag Coat of arms
- Motto: Renació el sol del Perú (Spanish for 'The sun of Peru was reborn')
- Anthem: "Himno Nacional del Perú" (Spanish) "National Anthem of Peru"
- Protectorate of Peru; Territories controlled and administered Territorial claims
- Capital: Lima
- Common languages: Spanish
- Religion: Roman Catholic
- Demonym: Peruvian
- Government: Provisional government
- Protector of Peru
  - July 28, 1821 – September 20, 1822: José de San Martín
- Historical era: Beginnings of the Republic
  - First constitution: 12 February 1821
  - Independence: 28 July 1821
  - Provisional statute: 8 October 1821
  - Protector of Peru: 3 August 1821
  - Guayaquil meeting: 26 July 1822
  - Congress installed: 20 September 1822
  - Military junta: 21 September 1822
Preceded by	Succeeded by
Viceroyalty of Peru; Liberating Expedition	Peruvian Republic

The Protectorate of San Martín (Spanish: Protectorado de San Martín), also known as the Protectorate of Peru (Spanish: Protectorado del Perú), was a provisional government created in 1821 in present-day Peru after its declaration of independence from the Spanish Empire. It existed for one year and 17 days under the rule of José de San Martín.

== Peruvian War of Independence ==
The Peruvian War of Independence was a series of military conflicts in Peru which began with José Fernando de Abascal y Sousa’s military reconquest of several territories in the 1811 Battle of Guaqui. This was followed by the defeat of the Spanish Army in the 1824 Battle of Ayacucho, and ended in 1826 with the siege of Callao. Wars of independence also took place after the 1780–1781 uprising by indigenous leader Túpac Amaru II and the earlier removal of the Upper Peru and Río de la Plata regions from the Viceroyalty of Peru. The viceroy often had the support of the "Lima oligarchy," who saw their elite interests threatened by popular rebellion and were opposed to the new commercial class in Buenos Aires. During the first decade of the 1800s, Peru had been a stronghold for royalists who fought freedom fighters in Peru, Upper Peru, Quito and Chile. Among the war's most important events was the proclamation of Peruvian independence by José de San Martín on July 28, 1821.

== History ==
The Spanish Empire's central authority was lost during the 1807–1814 Peninsular War, and many regions established autonomous local administrations known as juntas. Viceroy of Peru José Fernando de Abascal y Sousa was instrumental in organizing armies to suppress uprisings in Upper Peru and defending the region from armies sent by the juntas of the Río de la Plata. After the success of the royalist armies, Abascal annexed Upper Peru to the viceroyalty. This benefited the Lima merchants, since trade from the silver-rich region was then directed to the Pacific. Because of this, Peru remained strongly royalist and participated in the political reforms implemented by the Cortes of Cádiz (1810–1814) despite Abascal's resistance. Peru was represented at the first session of the Cortes by seven legislators, and local cabildos (representative bodies) were elected. It was the next-to-last redoubt of the Spanish monarchy in South America, after Upper Peru. Peru eventually succumbed to patriot armies after the decisive continental campaigns of José de San Martín (1820–1823) and Simón Bolívar (1823–1825).

Some of the early Spanish conquistadors who explored Peru made the first attempts at independence from the Spanish crown; they tried to liberate themselves from the viceroyalty, which was governed by the King of Castile. Several indigenous uprisings against colonial authority and its poor treatment of indigenous people took place during the eighteenth century, some of which evolved into rebellions. The Bourbon Reforms led to the rebellion of Túpac Amaru II, which was successfully repressed. The root cause of indigenous discontent remained, however, and whether these movements should be considered precedents of the broader emancipation led by chiefs (caudillos), Peruvian towns (pueblos), and other American countries is a subject of debate.

The independence of Peru is a significant chapter in the Spanish American wars of independence. The campaign of Sucre in Upper Peru concluded in April 1825 and, in November of that year, Mexico obtained the surrender of the Spanish bastion of San Juan de Ulúa in North America. Spanish strongholds in Callao and Chiloé in South America fell in January 1826. Spain renounced its American territories ten years later in 1836, leaving little of its once-vast empire intact.

=== Juntas ===
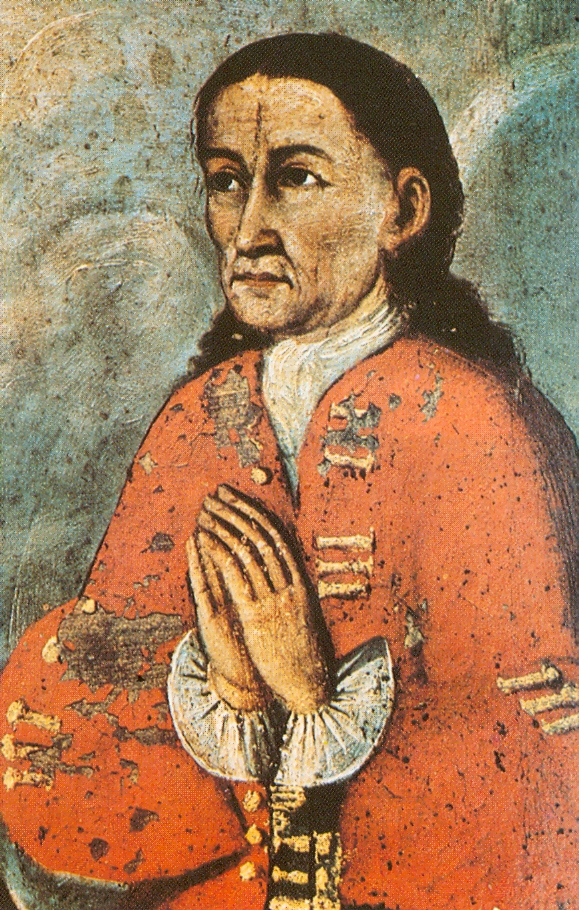
Peruvian revolutionary Mateo Pumacahua

Native juntas emerged despite Peru's royalist tendencies, often fomented by the approach of rebel armies from Buenos Aires. There were two short-lived uprisings in the southern city of Tacna, in 1811 and 1813. One significant movement, led by Natives in Huánuco, began on February 22, 1812. It had a number of leaders, including curacas and township magistrates (alcaldes pedáneos), but was suppressed in a few weeks.

The Cuzco Rebellion of 1814 began with a confrontation between the Constitutional Cabildo and the Real Audiencia of Cuzco over the city's administration, was more enduring. Cabildo members and their allies were arrested by the Audiencia. Criollo leaders appealed to retired brigadier Mateo Pumacahua, curaca of Chinchero, who was instrumental in suppressing the rebellion of Túpac Amaru II decades earlier. Pumacahua joined the Criollo leaders, forming a junta in Cuzco on August 3 which demanded the implementation of the Spanish Constitution of 1812's liberal reforms. After victories in southern and Upper Peru, the rebellion was quashed by mid-1815; the combined strength of royal forces and loyal curacas, including the Catacora and Apo Cari, took Cuzco and executed Pumacahua.

== Founding of the Peruvian Republic ==
=== José de San Martín and the Liberation Army of the South ===
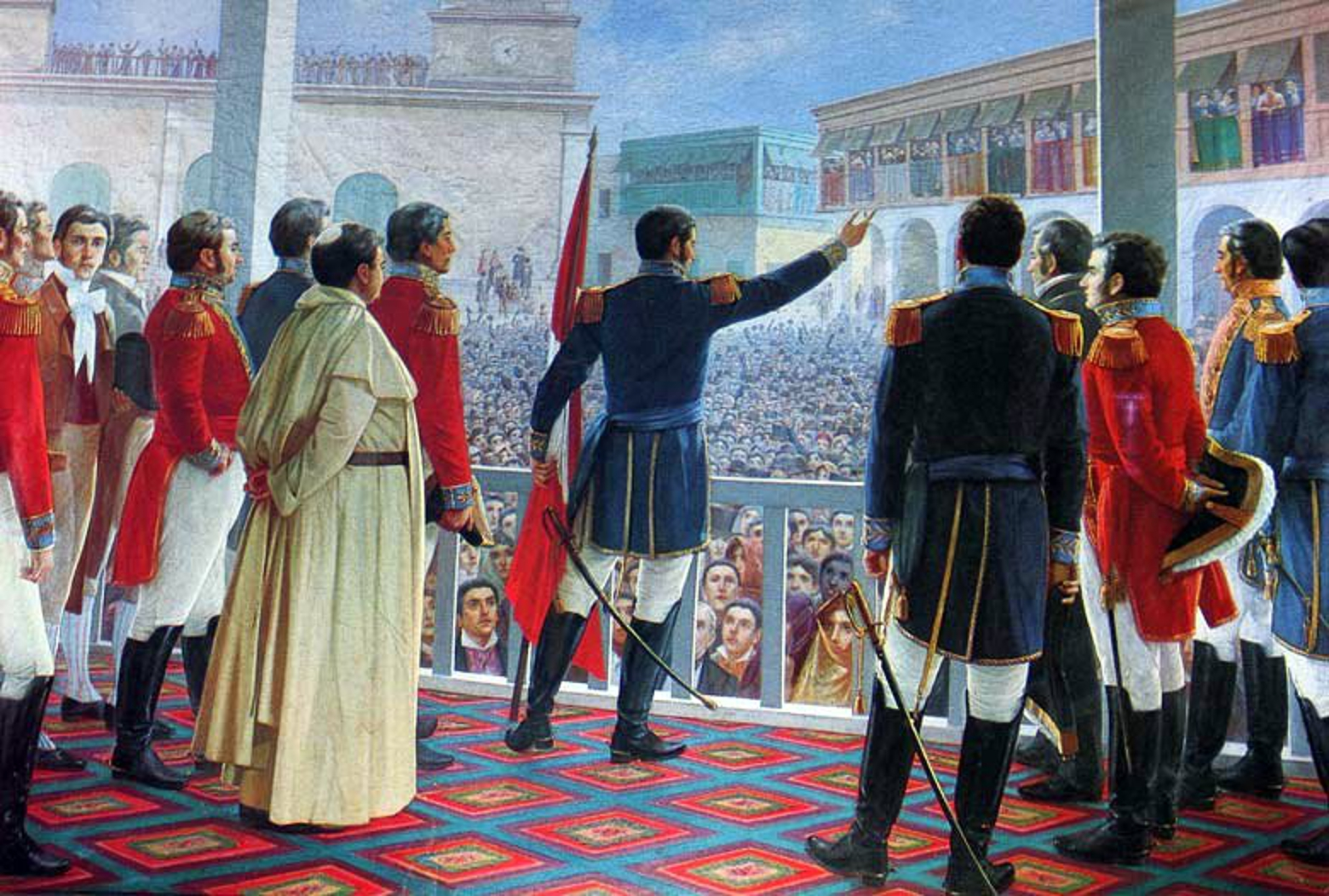
Juan Lepiani's Proclamación de la Independencia del Perú (1904)

After quashing the rebellion, the Viceroy of Peru organized two expeditions against Chile made up of royalist regiments from Lima and Arequipa and expeditionary elements from Europe. In 1814, the first expedition reconquered Chile after the Battle of Rancagua. After the royalist defeat in the 1817 Battle of Chacabuco, the second expedition against the Chilean patriots the following year was an attempt to restore the monarchy. Initially successful in the Second Battle of Cancha Rayada, the expedition was defeated by San Martín in the Battle of Maipú.

To begin the liberation of Peru, Argentina and Chile signed a treaty on February 5, 1819, to prepare for the invasion. San Martín believed that the liberation of Argentina would not be complete until the royalist stronghold in Peru was defeated.

=== Peruvian campaign ===
Following the Battle of Maipú and the liberation of Chile, the patriots began to prepare for an amphibious assault to liberate Peru. Although the costs of the campaign were originally to be assumed by Chile and Argentina, however, Bernardo O'Higgins' Chilean government absorbed most of its costs of the campaign. It was determined that the land army would be commanded by José de San Martín, and the navy would be commanded by Admiral Thomas Alexander Cochrane.

The 4,118-man Liberating Expedition of Peru made an amphibious landing on August 21, 1820, in Valparaíso under a Chilean flag. On September 7, the expedition arrived in the bay of Pisco in present-day Ica and captured the province by the following day. In an attempt to negotiate, the viceroy of Peru sent a letter to San Martín on September 15; however, negotiations broke down on October 14 with no clear result.

==== Beginning of hostilities ====
On October 9, 1820, Cuzco's reserve grenadier regiment began to rebel; this culminated in the proclamation of the independence of Guayaquil. On October 21, San Martín created the flag of the Republic of Peru.

Hostilities began with a campaign in the Peruvian highlands led by General Juan Antonio Álvarez de Arenales from October 4, 1820, to January 8, 1821. Arenales rejoined General San Martín in Huaura, and proclaimed the independence of the city of Huamanga (Ayacucho) on November 1, 1820. This was followed by the Battle of Cerro de Pasco, where Arenales defeated a royalist division sent by Viceroy Joaquín de la Pezuela. The rest of the liberation forces (under Admiral Cochrane) captured the royalist frigate Esmeralda on November 9, 1820, dealing the royalist navy a heavy blow. On December 2, the royalist battalion Batallón Voltígeros de la Guardia defected to the patriot side. On January 8, 1821, Arenales' troops rejoined the rest of the expedition on the coast.

Viceroy Pezuela was replaced by General José de la Serna on January 29, 1821. In March, insurgents led by Cochrane attacked the royalist ports of Arica and Tacna. The new viceroy announced his departure from Lima on June 5, 1821, but ordered a garrison to resist the patriots in the Real Felipe Fortress; this led to the first siege of Callao. The royalist army, under General José de Canterac, left Lima for the highlands on June 25, 1821. Arenales was sent by San Martín to observe the royalist retreat, and the expedition entered Lima two days later.

==== Declaration of independence ====
In Lima, San Martín invited the population to swear an oath to the cause of independence. The Act of Independence of Peru was signed on July 15, 1821. Future minister of international relations Manuel Pérez de Tudela wrote the act. Cochrane was welcomed into Lima two days later, and San Martín proclaimed independence in the city's Plaza Mayor on July 28, 1821.

==== San Martín leaves Peru ====
De la Serna moved his headquarters to Cuzco (or Qosqo) and tried to help the royalist forces in Callao. He sent troops commanded by General José de Canterac, who arrived in Lima on September 10, 1821, and tried in vain to relief the forces of General José de la Mar at the Fortress of Real Felipe. After learning about the viceroy's new orders, Canterac left for the highlands again on September 16. The republicans pursued the retreating royalists until they reached Jauja on October 1, 1821.

In Guayaquil, Antonio José de Sucre asked San Martín for help; San Martin led the Auxiliary Expedition of Santa Cruz to Quito. At the Guayaquil Conference, San Martín and Simón Bolívar later tried to decide Peru's political fate. San Martín argued for a constitutional monarchy, and Bolivar (head of the Northern Expedition) wanted a republic; both sought independence from Spain. San Martín left Peru on September 22, 1822, and left the independence movement's command to Bolívar.

In April 1822, a Royalist incursion defeated a Republican Army in the Battle of Ica. Cochrane left Peru on May 10 (after a dispute with San Martin), and was replaced by Martin Guisse as head of the navy. In January 1823, the Republicans under General Rudecindo Alvarado experienced another defeat at the hands of the Royalists at the Battles of Torata and Moquegua.

=== Bolívar, the Northern Expedition, and the end of colonialism ===
After its declaration of independence, Peru was bogged down by royalist resistance and state instability; the coast and Northern Peru were under republican command, but the rest of the country was controlled by the royalists. Viceroy la Serna had established his capital in Cuzco, and a republican campaign by General Santa Cruz was defeated. The war did not end until military intervention from Gran Colombia. In the wake of San Martín's self-exile and military defeats under President José de la Riva Agüero, the congress appealed to Simón Bolívar for help in 1823. Bolivar arrived in Lima on December 10, 1823, to liberate all of Peru.

In 1824, an uprising in the royalist camp in Upper Peru (present-day Bolivia) paved the way for the Battles of Battle of Junín and Ayacucho. The Peruvian army won the first for Bolívar, and the second for General Antonio José de Sucre. The war ended after the last royalist holdouts surrendered the Real Felipe Fortress in 1826.

== Aftermath ==
Although political dependence on Spain had ended, Peru was still economically dependent on Europe; the plunder of lands from indigenous people increased in the republican era. Indigenous domestic servants were treated inhumanely into the 20th century.

After independence, conflicts of interest in Criollo society and the ambitions of individual caudillos made governance difficult. The Peru–Bolivian Confederation was created in 1837, but it dissolved two years later amidst a military confrontation by Chile, Argentina, and Peruvian dissidents.
