= Battle of Corpahuaico =

- Part of the Peruvian War of Independence
Date	3 December 1824
Location	Matará, Huamanga, Peru
Result	Royalist victory

Belligerents
Patriots: Peru; Gran Colombia	Royalists: (Spain) Spanish Empire: Viceroyalty of Peru

Commanders and leaders
(Gran Colombia) Antonio de Sucre (Gran Colombia) Jacinto Lara	Jerónimo Valdés; José de la Serna

Casualties and losses
300	30

The Battle of Corpahuaico was fought in 1824 in the Andean highlands of Ayacucho, Peru between Patriot forces and one of the few remaining Royalists armies in South America.

== Description ==
A part of the Peruvian War of Independence, the battle occurred on December 3, 1824, and was one of the last Royalist victories in the wider Spanish American wars of independence. The battle saw the rearguard of the United Liberating Army of Peru commanded by Antonio José de Sucre suffer a minor defeat at the hands of the vanguard of the Royal Army of Peru commanded by Jerónimo Valdés. According to Sucre his losses were 300 men, some artillery and other pieces of equipments.

The rearguard, formed by the Rifles battalion, composed of British volunteers under the command of Colonel Arthur Sandes, was overtaken by Royalist forces. In the engagement, the Rifles lost a third of their force, including their second-in-command, Major Thomas Duchbury, who was killed in action.

The Royalist lost 30 men in the engagement.

The following day, the Patriot forces of Sucre defeated the pursuing Royalists at the plains of Tambo Cangallo.

== Bibliography ==
- O'Leary, Daniel Florencio (1919). Junín y Ayacucho (in Spanish). Madrid: Editorial América.
