= José de la Riva Agüero =

President of Peru in 1823 (1783–1858)

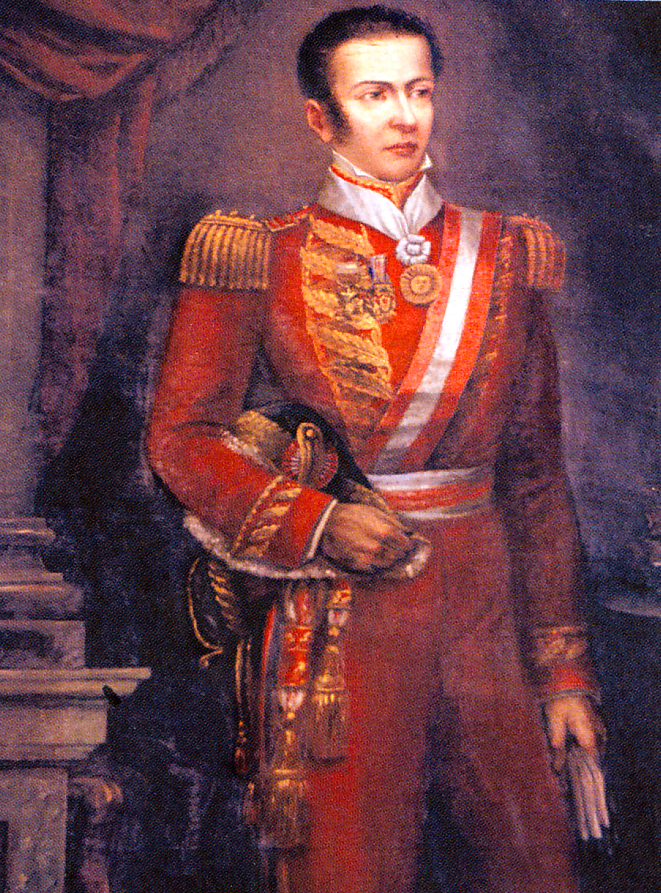

1st President of Peru
- In office: 28 February – 23 June 1823; 3 months and 26 days
- Succeeded by: José Bernardo de Tagle; Francisco Valdivieso y Prada (interim)

2nd President of North Peru
- In office: 1 August 1838 – 24 January 1839; 5 months and 23 days
- Preceded by: Luis José de Orbegoso

Personal details
- Born: 3 May 1783 Lima, Peru
- Died: 21 May 1858 (aged 75) Lima, Peru

José Mariano de la Cruz de la Riva Agüero y Sánchez Boquete (3 May 1783 – 21 May 1858) was a Peruvian soldier and politician who was the first president of Peru and the second president of North Peru, a constituent country of the Peru–Bolivian Confederation. A leading figure of the Peruvian War of Independence, he was president of Peru in 1823, being the first head of state to serve as President of the Republic and to wear the two-color presidential sash as a symbol of the power he exercised. Although this power was de facto, that is, born from a coup d'état and not by popular will expressed in elections, since it was imposed by the Peruvian Army through the so-called Balconcillo mutiny, which ordered Congress to dismiss the Supreme Governing Junta headed by José de La Mar. He governed for four months before being replaced by the Marquis of Torre Tagle. He was a supporter of liberalism.

Born to an aristocratic family from Lima he was a determined supporter of the independence movement from very early on. He was in Spain at the time of the Napoleonic invasion, joining the Masonic lodges that at that time were working towards the independence of America. In 1810 he returned to Peru and, from then until the arrival of José de San Martín, he was the main figure of the anticolonial conspiracies in Lima, directing the Lodge of the Copetudos. He collaborated with San Martín before and after his arrival in Peru. Once the Protectorate of Peru was established, he was named president (prefect) of the department of Lima. He was named president after the Balconcillo mutiny, the first coup d'état in the country's republican history.

Riva-Agüero sought to conclude the independence of Peru initiated by separate uprisings a decade before. Thus, without the use of foreign troops, he managed to organize an army and a fleet for the Second Intermedios campaign. The company led by Andrés de Santa Cruz failed in its attempt to stop the royalist advance and the expedition was defeated. Disagreements with Congress and the arrival of Simón Bolívar determined the end of his brief government and his deportation to Guayaquil, first, and later to Europe, where he resided until 1828, then returning to America. He went first to Chile, then returned to Peru in 1833 and was elected deputy for Lima to the National Convention of 1833, which reincorporated him into the Army with the title of grand marshal. A supporter of President Luis José de Orbegoso, he was plenipotentiary minister in Chile and under the Peru–Bolivian Confederation he was president of North Peru. After the Confederation's dissolution, he went to Ecuador again. When he returned in 1843, he retired to private life.

== Early life and political career ==
Riva Agüero was born in Lima in 1783. His father was José de la Riva Agüero y Basso della Rovere, a Spanish aristocrat of Italian origin and a matrilineal descendant of the Della Rovere family. His mother was María Josefa Sánchez Boquete y Román de Aulestia, a member of the ancient Spaniard nobility established in Lima and a sister of the Marquis de Montealegre de Aulestia.

Although the first representatives of the de la Riva Agüero family were established in Peru since the 17th century, his father just settled down himself in the last quarter of the 18th century. He was part of the tribunal which accompanied visitador José Antonio de Areche to Peru in 1777 and was then appointed Superintendent of the Royal Mint of Peru (Real Casa de Moneda), a post he occupied until his death.

Riva Agüero spent his childhood in Lima, where he received his early education and a commission as lieutenant of the Regiment of the Nobility Corps in 1796 when he was thirteen years old. He was sent to Spain to complete his military education under the supervision of influential paternal relatives (one of his uncles was Minister of the Consejo de Indias and another one lieutenant general of the Army), however he decided to abandon his career as well as his subsequent legal studies to travel to France. In 1805, he was appointed Knight of the Order of Charles III and confirmed in 1807.

Returned to Madrid, Riva Agüero participated in the wars against the Napoleonic invasion. Moved by the nationalist ardor caused by the Napoleonic invasion in 1808, he was involved in some early actions against the French in Guipuzcoa and Burgos and then joined the forces of General Echevarri in Cordoba participating in the Battle of Alcolea Bridge.

In 1809, aware of the fact that his military career in the Spanish Army was limited due in part to the legal restriction that prevented American Spaniards to accede to high offices, he decided to initiate a career in the colonial administration. He was appointed Minister Judge of the Royal Mint of Peru, accountant of the Court of Auditors (Tribunal Mayor de Cuentas) and Judge of the Royal Lottery of Lima (Real Ramo de Suertes). That same year, his father died and Riva Agüero decided to return to Lima. By that time, he was already known for his adhesion to separatist ideals, so the Spanish authorities in Buenos Aires, Montevideo and Mendoza tried to prevent him entering Peru.

In Lima, Riva Agüero participated actively in various conspiracies for the Peruvian independence, the reason for which he was placed under strict surveillance by order of Viceroy Abascal. In 1813, his first work on the state of the Court of Auditors of Lima was destroyed by the Viceroy and Riva Agüero tried and placed under house arrest. Next year, he participated in the failed conspiracy of Quiroz and Pardo de Zela to take the government of Lima, in the conspiracy of Gómez and in the conspiracy of 1819.

José de San Martín named him prefect of Lima in 1822. Upon the departure of San Martín and the ensuing social instability in the country, Andrés de Santa Cruz revolted against the Peruvian Congress on 26 February 1823 and forced it to elect Riva Agüero as President. Riva Agüero proclaimed himself "President of Peru", the first to use such title.

During his short government, he suffered the entry of Spanish troops into the capital and the departure of the government towards a new installation at the port of Callao. Under this situation, Riva Agüero lost all support of the Peruvian Congress, which awaited anxiously the arrival of Simón Bolívar. He was later deposed by Antonio José de Sucre. Sucre was succeeded by José Bernardo de Torre Tagle until the arrival of Simón Bolívar. Congress had been waiting for the Venezuelan "Liberator" to come to Peru and help to consolidate the Independence of the country, and was more than willing to grant him all necessary powers.

Fearing the loss of leadership, Riva Agüero sought to conciliate with the viceroy to prevent the arrival of Bolívar, only to be arrested and accused of high treason. He was subsequently exiled to Chile. There he wrote the Memorias y documentos para la Historia de la Independencia del Perú y causas del mal éxito que ha tenido ésta (Memories and documents for the history of the independence of Peru and causes for its failure so far), one of the most important sources for the period.

During the short-lived Peru-Bolivian Confederation Riva Agüero supported Mariscal Andrés de Santa Cruz, and became president of the Republic of North Peru in 1838. After its collapse, he retired from public life until his death in 1858.

He had five children with Princess Caroline-Arnoldine de Looz-Corswarem. His eldest son was José de la Riva-Agüero y Looz-Corswarem.

== Conspiracy in Lima ==
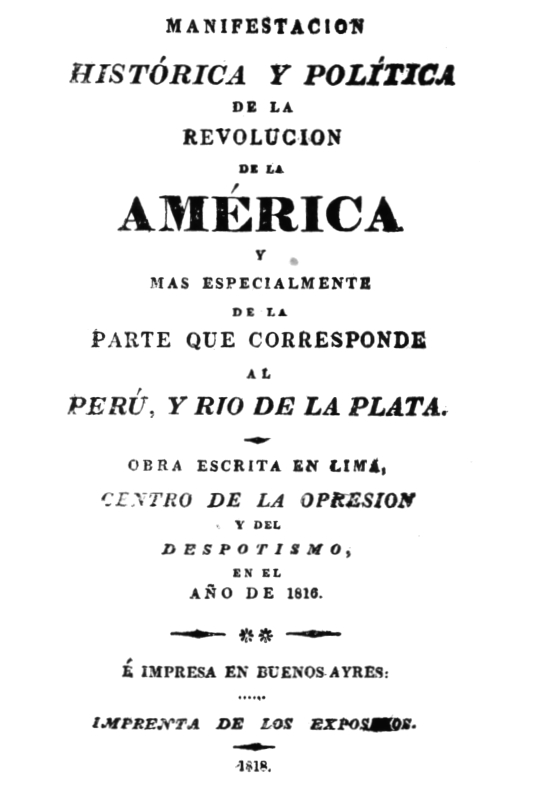
Cover page of Manifestación histórica y política de la revolución de América.

During his time in Spain he joined an American lodge that worked for the independence of America. He came back to Peru after he was appointed as accountant and conservative judge in the area of luck and lotteries in the Tribunal Mayor de Cuentas de Lima (1810), returned to Peru, via Buenos Aires, decided to support the independence movement. During his trip, he avoided harassment from the authorities: he was briefly arrested in Montevideo but; in Buenos Aires, he had to flee furtively after realizing that they were going to return him to Spain. Something similar happened in the city of Mendoza.

Already established in Lima, he was associated with various groups of patriots and maintained active correspondence with those of Chile and Buenos Aires, which had already been installed Governing Boards. He ran Lima's Lodge from home, located at Santa Teresa (now fifth block of Jirón Puno) or the house of the Count of Vega del Ren, in the street of Botica San Pedro (now fourth block of Jirón Miró Quesada). He was involved in almost all Lima conspiracies, which were closely monitored by the authorities and eventually persecuted. However, the intervention of powerful friends and relatives saved him.

In 1816 he wrote a Manifestación histórica y política de la revolución de América, published anonymously in Buenos Aires in 1818 in which he exposed 20 causes justifying the insurgency against the colonial regime.

== Contact with San Martín ==
Riva Agüero was then in intensive contacts with José de San Martín, who after securing the independence of Chile planned to go to Peru. He sent valuable data on the situation of the royalist forces and helped define the plan of operations of the Army of the Andes to attack the central coast of Peru to penetrate the Upper Peru. For all these reasons, the figure of Riva Agüero was instrumental in achieving the emancipation of Spanish America.

At that time, a messenger of San Martin was captured with correspondence that was addressed to Riva Agüero and other Lima patriots in April 1819. The Viceroy Joaquín de la Pezuela then ordered the confinement of Riva Agüero in Tarma (central highlands of Peru) while preparing a boat to take him to Spain, but the legal appeal and the disruption caused by the arrival of San Martin during his Freedom Expedition led such a severe measure to be abandoned.

Even in such conflict Riva Agüero continued laboring for the cause of independence, convincing many officers to desert the royal troops. Indeed, he was one of those who influenced over Numancia Battalion's celebrated change to the patriot ranks. Similarly, he promoted the guerrilla organization to sever accesses in Lima. He also helped to produce the schism and disagreement among the Spanish generals themselves and help to infiltrate the royal army with double agents.

== Personal life ==
In 1826 Riva-Aguero married Princess Caroline-Arnoldine-Irénée de Looz-Corswarem at Wolvendael Castel, near Brussels. Princess Caroline was a daughter of Charles, Duke of Looz-Corswarem, a member of the former reigning house of the Principality of Rheina-Wolbeck which was later integrated into the Belgian nobility. The couple had five children:

1. José (1827-1881), Minister of Foreign Affairs of Peru and grandfather of José de la Riva Aguero y Osma, Marquis de Montealegre.
2. Carolina (1829-1889), unmarried.
3. Carlos (1831-), unmarried.
4. Alphonse (1834-1904), member of the Noble Guard of Pius IX and official of the Belgian Army. Married Gabrielle van de Velve.
5. André (1837-1905), camérier secret of Pius IX and prémier chambellan of Charles III of Monaco. Married Joséphine, Countess Hemptinne. Their only child was the painter Caroline Stiénon du Pré, wife of Ludovic, baron Stiénon du Pré.

Personal and economic difficulties caused the separation of the couple. After Riva Aguero's death, Princess Caroline permanently settled down in Belgium living in the Chateau of Niel, her ancestral home.

His young children accompanied their mother and pursued careers in European courts and the Belgian army obtaining later the Belgian nationality. Only his eldest son remained in Peru where he pursued a political career. His descendant was the historian and politician José de la Riva Aguero y Osma, Marquis of Montealegre and of Casa-Dávila, one of the most important Peruvian intellectuals of the 20th Century.

== See also ==
- Peru–Bolivian Confederation

Political offices
Preceded by José Bernardo de Tagle	President of Peru; 1823	Succeeded by Antonio José de Sucre; Francisco Valdivieso y Prada
Preceded by Luis José de Orbegoso	President of North Peru; 1838–1839	Succeeded by Republic dissolved
