= Balconcillo mutiny =

1823 coup d'état in Peru

1823 Peruvian coup d'état
Date	27 February 1823
Location	Balconcillo hacienda, La Victoria District, Lima, Department of Lima
Result	Military Army victory; Riva Agüero is named as President of Peru on February 28; Beginning of the First Militarism, which results in Simón Bolívar governing Peru in 1824

Belligerents
Government of Peru	Army of the Centre

Commanders and leaders
José de La Mar; José Bernardo de Tagle	José de la Riva Agüero; Andrés de Santa Cruz

The Balconcillo mutiny (Spanish: Motín de Balconcillo) or La Victoria uprising (Spanish: Levantamiento de La Victoria) was the first coup d'état in the history of Peru, which took place on 27 February 1823, at the Balconcillo hacienda of La Victoria in Lima, in response to the failed military campaign against the Royalist forces supporting the Spanish monarchy in the south.

== Coup ==
The defeat of the Patriot forces in the First Intermedios campaign led to increased tensions between the Peruvian Army and the Constituent Congress. It was feared that the Royalists could reach Lima, which was used by army chiefs to criticise the ineffectiveness of Congress.

On 26 February 1823, heads of the Army of the Centre, led by Andrés de Santa Cruz, headquartered at the Balconcillo hacienda, signed a demand to dissolve the short-lived and unstable Congress and its Governing Junta. A day later, after Congress stated that they would postpone the discussion that the army demanded, the troops moved from the Balconcillo hacienda to Lima. Upon the arrival of the troops, some of the civilians who had heard about the instability of Congress took to the streets in support of the army. Given the coercion to which Congress was subjected, they were forced to accept the army's demands.

José de la Riva Agüero was elected head of state of the country on 28 February, being the first to govern with the title of President. On 4 March, he was also granted the controversial title of Grand Marshal of the Armies of the Republic, despite the fact that he had never fought a single battle.

Riva Agüero and the Congress later clashed, with the latter declaring him a traitor and the former dissolving the entity, thus beginning the so-called First Militarism, a period of anarchy which concluded with Simón Bolívar governing Peru in 1824.

== See also ==
- First Intermedios campaign

== Bibliography ==
- Basadre Grohmann, Jorge Alfredo (2005) [1939]. Historia de la República del Perú [History of the Republic of Peru] (in Spanish). Vol. 1 (9th ed.). Lima: Producciones Cantabria. ISBN 978-612-306-354-2.
