= Battle of Zepita =

Battle during the Peruvian War of Independence

- Part of the Peruvian War of Independence
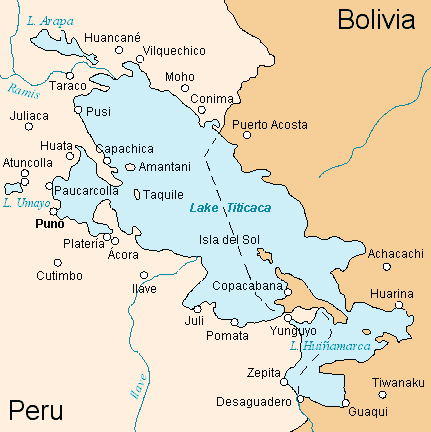
Date	25 August 1823
Location	Zepita District, Puno Region, Peru
Result	Indecisive

Belligerents
Peru	Spain

Commanders and leaders
(Peru) Andrés de Santa Cruz	(Spain) Jerónimo Valdés

Strength
1,600	1,800

Casualties and losses
28 killed 84 wounded 30 captured	100 killed 184 captured

The Battle of Zepita, also known as the Battle of Chua Chua, was fought between the forces of future Peruvian president Santa Cruz and the Viceroyalty of Peru. Santa Cruz's army captured 240 rifles, 52 saddles, 240 lances and 63 sabers from the Royalist army.
