= Battle of Artaza =

Battle of the First Carlist War

Coordinates: 42°46′13″N 2°06′33″W

- Part of First Carlist War
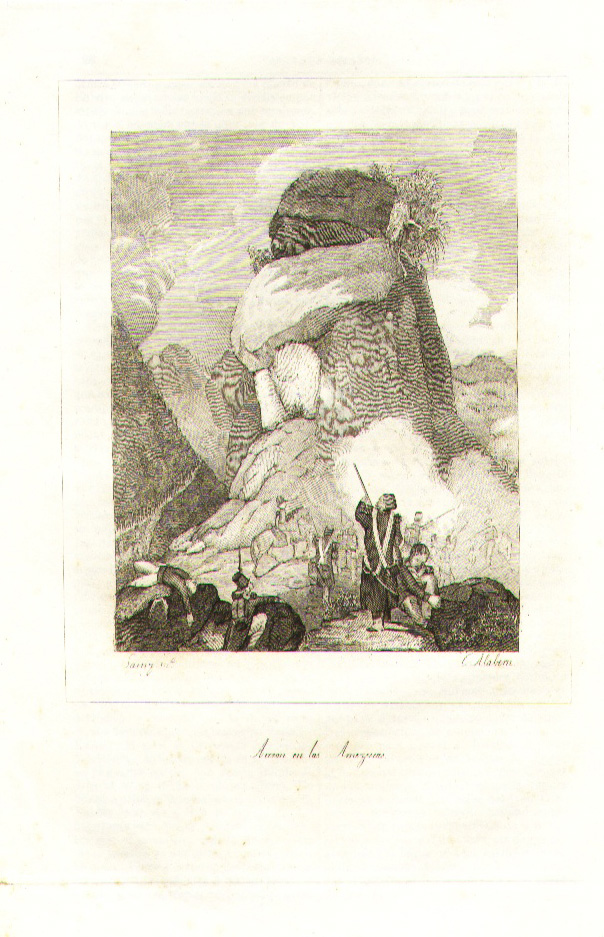
- The Battle of Artaza
Date	20–22 April 1835
Location	Artaza (Améscoa Baja), Navarre, Spain
Result	Carlist victory

Belligerents
Carlists supporting Infante Carlos of Spain	Liberals (Isabelinos or Cristinos) supporting Isabella II of Spain and her regent mother Maria Christina

Commanders and leaders
Tomás de Zumalacárregui	Jerónimo Valdés

Strength
5,000	22,000

The Battle of Artaza (Acción de Artaza) occurred on 20–22 April 1835 during the First Carlist War. Jerónimo Valdés, at the time Minister of War, arrived at the area known as Las Amescoas with 22,000 men with the intention of definitively destroying the Carlist forces.

Zumalacárregui had 5,000 men, but had the advantage of knowing the terrain and practicing guerrilla tactics.

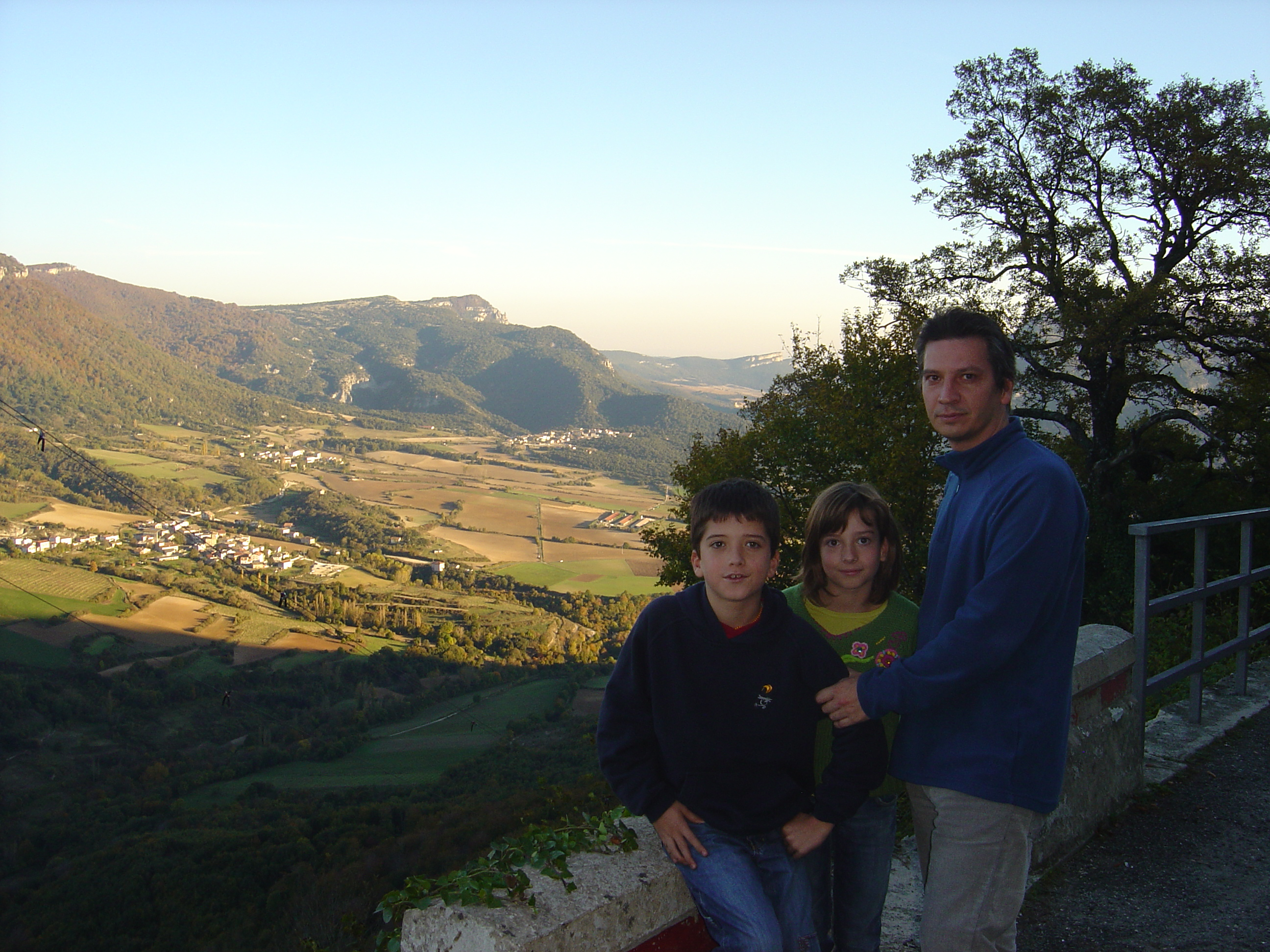
Fields of Artaza in Améscoa Baja seen from Zudaire.

Valdes’ troops maneuvered up the mountains in the area. The Carlists, meanwhile, were hidden in the foliage, and were able to harass the Liberal troops day and night until the Liberals gave way. The total casualties were 700 men.
