= Battle of Moquegua =

Coordinates: 17°12′00″S 70°56′00″W

- Part of the First Intermedios campaign in the Peruvian War of Independence
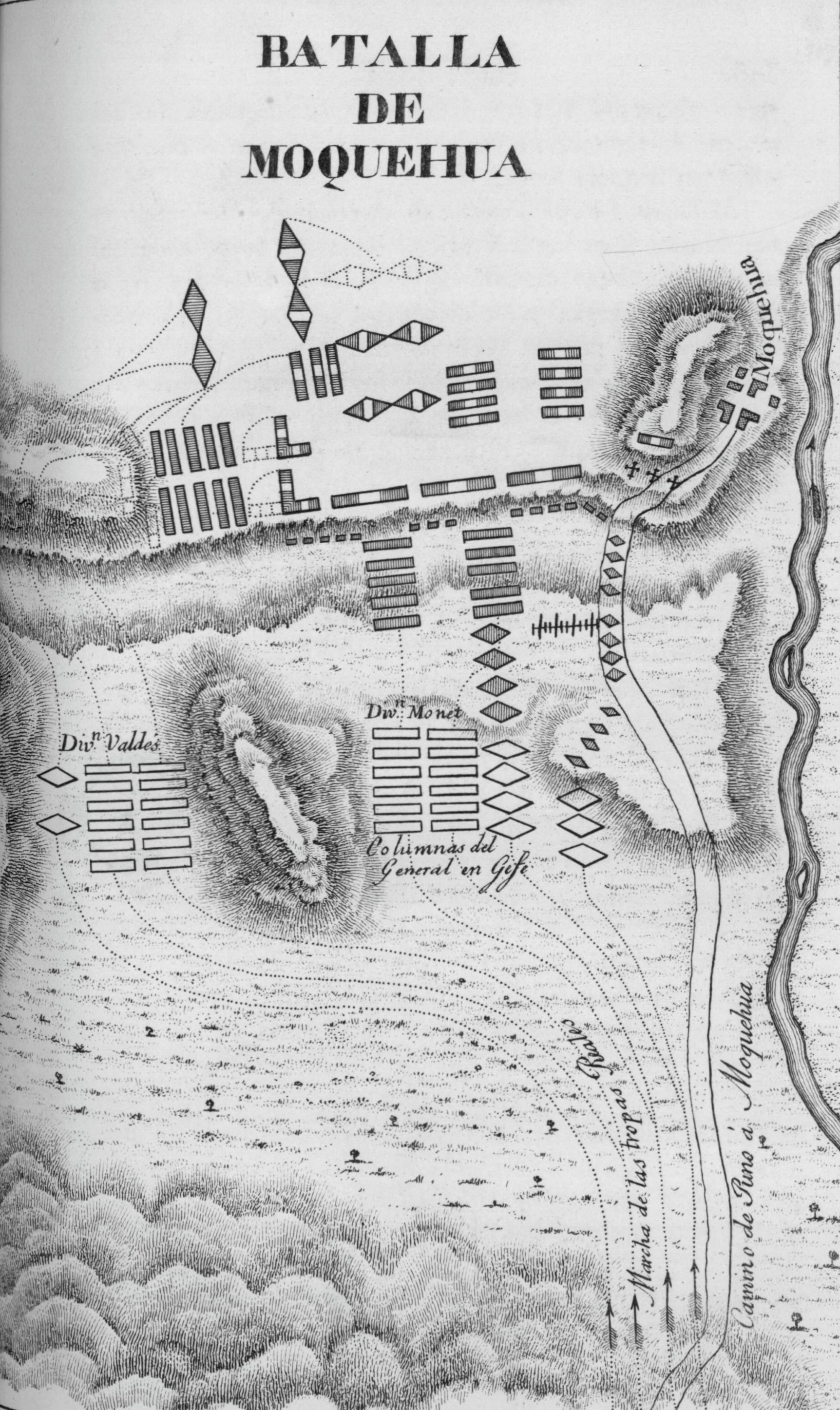
- 1830 sketch of the Battle of Moquegua
Date	21 January 1823
Location	Moquegua, Moquegua Region, Peru
Result	Royalist victory

Belligerents
Liberating Expedition; Peru	Spain

Commanders and leaders
Rudecindo Alvarado	(Spain) José Canterac (Spain) Jerónimo Valdés

Strength
2,800 men	2,522 men

Casualties and losses
700 killed 1,000 captured	150 killed 250 wounded

The Battle of Moquegua (or Moquehua) took place during the Peruvian War of Independence on 21 January 1823 around the city of Moquegua, between the Liberation Army of Peru, under command of Argentinean General Rudecindo Alvarado, and the Royal Army of Peru under General José de Canterac. The army of the Patriots was almost completely destroyed.

== Prelude ==
After José de San Martín had abandoned Peru in September 1822, command of the United Peruvian army fell to General Rudecindo Alvarado, under whose command the United army was ordered to defeat the bulk of the Royalist troops that were still intact in the south and the country's mountains.

In the first days of October, Alvarado's expedition, composed of approximately 4,300 troops and 10 pieces of artillery, sailed from Callao and on 6 December, landed in Arica.
Spanish Viceroy José de la Serna, located in Cusco, ordered Brigadier Gerónimo Valdés to immediately march to Arequipa to take command of the troops stationed there, and attack the army of Alvarado.Both armies met at Torata and the Battle of Torata ended in a defeat for the Patriots.

After the battle of Torata, the Patriot army retreated to the town of Moquegua with the intention of reorganizing its forces. But the Royalists, knowing that reinforcements under command of General José de Canterac were very close, did not plan to let victory, that was considered certain, slip away. After the arrival of the division of General Canterac, the Royalist army went on the offensive.

== the Battle ==
General-in-Chief José de Canterac divided the Royalist army into two divisions. The first under the orders of Brigadier Valdés was to march hiding behind a hill on the enemy's right. The second divisions, under the command of Brigadier Manuel Monet, was to execute a frontal attack.
Meanwhile, General Alvarado's forces remained in Moquegua, with few ammunition and inactive.

On 21 January, Canterac advanced and met the Patriots in the Tombolombo pampa, adjacent to the Moquegua River. At 10 in the morning the forces were face to face only separated by the river. Canterac gave the sign for a simultaneous frontal attack by Monet and an enveloping attack by Valdés on the right flank. The patriot defense was overwhelmed and dispersed, giving up the battlefield. As a result, about 700 Patriots were killed, and 1,000 taken prisoner. On the other hand, Royalist casualties totaled 150 dead and 250 wounded.

== Aftermath ==
The surviving Patriots retreated to Iquique, where they were attacked by General Olañeta, and lost an other 100 men, before being able to embark at Ilo to return to Lima. The campaign had been a total disaster. Of the initial 4,300 men, only around 1,000 returned to Lima. Many elite troops from Chile had been lost.

== Links ==
- Centreo de Estudios Histórico Militares del Perú
