= Battle of Torata =

Battle that took place during the Peruvian War of Independence

Coordinates: 17°4′37″S 70°50′36″W

- Part of the First Intermedios campaign in the Peruvian War of Independence
Date	19 January 1823
Location	Torata District, Moquegua Region, Peru
Result	Royalist victory

Belligerents
Liberating Expedition; Peru	Spain

Commanders and leaders
Rudecindo Alvarado	(Spain) Jerónimo Valdés

Strength
3,857 men	1,500–1,700 men

Casualties and losses
500–700 casualties 100 captured	250 casualties

The Battle of Torata is part of the Peruvian War of Independence, which occurred on 19 January 1823 on the heights around Torata (town located northeast of Moquegua) between the Liberation Army of Peru, under command of Argentinean General Rudecindo Alvarado, and Royal Army of Peru under Gen. Brigadier Jerónimo Valdés and culminated with the defeat of Patriots whose army would be almost completely destroyed two days later at the Battle of Moquegua with support of General José de Canterac.

== The battle ==
After José de San Martín had abandoned Peru in September 1822, command of the United Peruvian army fell to General Rudecindo Alvarado, under whose command the United army was ordered to defeat the bulk of the Royalist troops that were still intact in the south and the country's mountains. The first goal was to take the remaining ports under Spanish control, intermediate between Arequipa and Tarapacá. Therefore this expedition was called the First Intermediate Campaign.

In the first days of October, Alvarado's expedition, composed of approximately 4,300 troops and 10 pieces of artillery, sailed from Callao and on 6 December, it landed in Arica. Spanish Viceroy José de la Serna, located in Cusco, ordered Brigadier Gerónimo Valdés to immediately march to Arequipa to take command of the troops stationed there, and attack the army of Alvarado. Both armies met at Torata and the battle ended in a defeat for the Patriots, mainly because of dissensions between the officers and a lack of discipline amongst the troops.
