= President of Peru =

Head of state and government

Constitutional President of the Republic of Peru
- Presidenta Constitucional de la República del Perú
- Presidential standard

- Incumbent; Keiko Fujimori since 28 July 2026
- Executive branch of the Government of Peru
- Style: Mr./Madam President (Señor/a Presidente/a) (informal); The Most Excellent (Excelentísimo/a Señor/a) (diplomatic); His/Her Excellency (Su Excelencia) (diplomatic)
- Type: Head of state Head of government Commander-in-chief
- Residence: Palacio de Gobierno
- Seat: Lima
- Appointer: Direct popular vote Congress of Peru
- Term length: Five years, renewable non-consecutively
- Constituting instrument: Constitution of Peru (1993)
- Inaugural holder: José de San Martín (de facto); José de la Riva Agüero (first to use the title)
- Formation: 28 July 1821 (205 years ago)
- Succession: Line of succession
- Deputy: First Vice President
- Salary: S/.35,568 monthly
- Website: www.gob.pe/presidencia/ (in Spanish)

The president of Peru (Spanish: presidente del Perú), officially the constitutional president of the Republic of Peru (Spanish: presidente constitucional de la República del Perú), is the head of state and head of government of Peru. The president is the head of the executive branch and is the supreme head of the Armed Forces and National Police of Peru. The office of president corresponds to the highest magistracy in the country, making the president the highest-ranking public official in Peru. Due to broadly interpreted impeachment wording in the 1993 Constitution of Peru, the Congress of Peru can impeach the president without cause, effectively making the executive branch subject to the legislature.

The president is elected to control the general policy of the government, work with the Congress of the Republic and the Council of Ministers to enact reform, and be an administrator of the state, enforcing the constitution, which establishes the presidential requirements, rights, and obligations. The executive branch is located at the Palacio de Gobierno, located in the historic center of Lima. The building has been used and occupied by the heads of state of Peru, dating back to Francisco Pizarro and the viceroys of Peru.

The current president is Keiko Fujimori. She was sworn into office on 28 July 2026.

== Presidential terms and transitions ==
=== Constitutional limits ===
Ordinarily, the president is elected to a five-year term, and is barred from immediate reelection. A former president can run again after being out of office for a full term. The presidential inauguration takes place on 28 July in Congress. The date also marks the independence from Spain and is a national holiday. The Congress of the Republic has the power to end a president's term prematurely through impeachment. Under Article 113 of the Constitution of 1993, the president can be removed due to death, "permanent moral or physical disability" determined by Congress, resignation, fleeing national territory without permission from Congress, or dismissal for committing infractions outlined in Article 117 of the Constitution. Four (Note: José Jerí served as President of the Republic in virtue of his position as President of Congress. The legislature successfully voted to remove him from the latter, thus also ending his presidency. The removal was done through a censure which has a different vote threshold, as such he is not considered impeached.) presidents have been successfully impeached and removed from office: Alberto Fujimori (2000), Martín Vizcarra (2020, second impeachment), Pedro Castillo (2022, third impeachment), and Dina Boularte (2025).

Several presidents of Peru (Note: Nicolás de Piérola's brief presidency in 1881, during the War of the Pacific, also ended with his resignation, although at that time the Peruvian government was split between himself and Francisco García Calderón, with neither of them ruling over the entire country.) have attempted to resign due to political crisis: Juan Antonio Pezet (1865), Mariano Ignacio Prado (1868), Miguel Iglesias (1885), Andrés Avelino Cáceres (1895), Guillermo Billinghurst (1914), (Note: Forced resignation as part of the 1914 Peruvian coup d'état.) Alberto Fujimori (2000) (Note: Fujimori submitted his resignation, but it was rejected by the Congress in favor of impeachment.), Pedro Pablo Kuczynski (2018) and Manuel Merino (2020). In addition, the first two presidents, Riva Agüero and José Bernardo de Tagle, were forcefully removed from office during the Peruvian War of Independence. There have also been a number of unrecognized presidents: in 1992 and 2019, after the dissolution of the Congress, the legislative body unsuccessfully removed the president from office and swore in vice presidents as the de facto president.

There have been 20 attempted coups d'état in Peru's history, 16 of which were successful. The last successful coup d'état was carried out by Alberto Fujimori in 1992, who was later imprisoned for human rights violations and corruption. The most recent attempted coup occurred in 2022 when Pedro Castillo attempted to dissolve the Congress.

== History ==
During its more than 190 years of independence, Peru has been ruled by the military leaders who fought for independence, the leaders of the War of the Pacific, representatives of the aristocracy, and democratically elected leaders. Also, the history of the presidency has involved civil wars, coups and violence. More than once, several individuals claimed the right to be president at the same time. Different titles have been used, such as "Protector of Peru" (used by José de San Martín), and "Supreme Protector" (by Andrés de Santa Cruz).

=== Pre-Republican era ===
The first state recognizable as such under current concepts in the central Andes was the Wari civilization, whose system of government has not yet been fully unraveled. Later, between the thirteenth century and the sixteenth century, the Inca civilization developed, whose State, based on the political management of reciprocity and alien to all European conceptions of then and now, had the Sapa Inca at its head.

The modern Peruvian state is the heir of the Viceroyalty of Peru. In 1532, the Spanish conquerors arrived in the territory, imposed their dominion and managed to establish a Spanish dependency. This dependence began as governorships corresponding to the conquerors, with the title of "Governor". The Governorate of the New Toledo (Diego de Almagro) – which otherwise never consolidated – had as its capital the city of Cusco, the current historical capital of Peru. The Governorate of the New Castile (Francisco Pizarro) had as its capital the City of Kings, as Lima was also called initially and it was on this that the viceroyalty was instituted after the civil wars.

In 1542, the Viceroyalty of Peru was established, whose government was held by the representative of the king of Spain (head of state) with the title of Viceroy of Peru (head of government). The true organizer of the viceregal state was Francisco de Toledo. This period had only two stages corresponding to the two Spanish dynasties, the houses of Habsburg and Bourbon, and lasted 282 years from its establishment in 1542 to the Capitulation of Ayacucho in 1824, despite the independence of Peru in 1821.

José Fernando de Abascal was in charge of centralizing Spanish political and military power in Peru. His successors, the last viceroys of Peru were parallel to José de San Martín and his first successors. Joaquín de la Pezuela and José de la Serna faced the liberating armies and the last of them signed the capitulation. Finally, Pío Tristán was the interim viceroy in charge of transferring power to the patriots.

=== Republic era ===
In July 1821, during the Peruvian War of Independence, the autonomous states lying in the viceroyalty of Peru declared themselves as independent and sovereign from influence and mediation from the Spanish Empire. Recognizing the impending threat of Spanish backlash to regain their lost colonies, the autonomous viceroyalty began to draft a constitution on which they would decide to base the sovereign nation. The Act of Independence was signed in Lima on 15 August 1821. The government was left under the charge of José de San Martín, with the title of "Protector". Later, the legislative branch occupied the executive branch. Francisco Xavier de Luna Pizarro, a Peruvian politician, presided and led the Constituent Congress of Peru of 1822, leading to him being subjectively regarded as the first informal President of Peru. The Congress immediately established a Supreme Governing Junta, led by José de la Mar.

In February 1823, the Congress was forced to recognize José de la Riva Agüero as the first "President of the Republic", following the Balconcillo mutiny. He was quickly replaced by José Bernardo de Tagle, who proclaimed the Constitution of 1823. Since then, that has been the main denomination that has held the great majority of the rulers of Peru. The first popular elections were not held until 1829, when Agustín Gamarra was elected constitutional president.

The first articles of the 1823 Constitution consisted of 24 items, known as the "Bases". These bases formally defined the borders of the Andean nation and formally created the First Republic of Peru, which still holds until the present day. The governing board, led by Luna Pizarro, declared Peruvian autonomy from Spain and a Catholic state. Additionally, the Constitution defined the three powers of the government, the executive, judicial and the legislative power. The governing board, a colloquial terminology that was used to classify the ten politicians that devised these 24 items, was the first representation of executive power and the executive branch in Peruvian history.

Only one constitution has been contrary, partially, to the presidential republican system. The 1826 "Lifetime" Constitution of Simón Bolívar, which proclaimed him "lifetime president". After issues arose around the bases, Bolivar was granted overwhelming power over the legislative and executive organs of the Peruvian government. At the same time, Bolivar was already undergoing a campaign to establish a dictatorship around Andean Latin American nations. As a precursor, this incentivized the initial drafters of the constitution and the Governing Board to accelerate the process of defining reasonable executive powers, balance the three branches of power, and begin to draft an idea for the roles and powers of the official position of state leader of Peru. By 1827, an outline of an executive along with the executive branch had been drawn out to prevent a Bolivarian dictatorship which would be seen by the populace as a general return to Spanish tyrannical rule. Congress then elected José de la Mar, who is also sometimes considered the first president.

== Powers and duties ==
The acts of the President of the Republic that lack ministerial endorsement are null. It corresponds to the President of the Republic to preside over the Council of Ministers when it is convened or when he attends its sessions. The President of the Republic appoints and removes the President of the council. The President of the Republic on the proposal and with an agreement of the President of the council can appoint and remove other ministers. The ministers are individually responsible for their own acts and for the presidential acts they endorse. All ministers are jointly and severally liable for criminal acts or violations of the Constitution or the laws that the President of the Republic incurs or that are agreed upon in the council, even if they save their vote unless they resign immediately. The Constitution of 1993, a product of the Presidency of Alberto Fujimori (1990–2000), is the constitution that is currently in place.

=== 1993 Constitution ===
The President of the Republic, in addition to the Head of State, is the Head of the national Government. Its functions are explicit in the Constitution and the Organic Law of the Executive Power.

1. Comply and enforce the Constitution and treaties, laws and other legal provisions.
2. Represent the State, inside and outside the Republic.
3. Direct the general policy of the Government.
4. Ensure the internal order and the external security of the Republic.
5. Convene elections for President of the Republic and for representatives to Congress, as well as for mayors and aldermen and other officials indicated by law.
6. Summon the Congress to an extraordinary legislature; and sign, in that case, the decree of convocation.
7. Direct messages to the Congress at any time and obligatorily, in a personal form and in writing, upon the installation of the first annual ordinary legislature. The annual messages contain a detailed exposition of the situation of the Republic and the improvements and reforms that the President deems necessary and convenient for consideration by the Congress. The messages of the President of the Republic, except for the first one, are approved by the Council of Ministers.
8. Exercise the power to regulate the laws without transgressing or denaturing them; and, within such limits, issue decrees and resolutions.
9. Comply and enforce the judgments and resolutions of the jurisdictional bodies.
10. Fulfill and enforce the resolutions of the National Elections Jury.
11. Direct foreign policy and international relations; and celebrate and ratify treaties.
12. Appoint ambassadors and plenipotentiary ministers, with the approval of the Council of Ministers, with the responsibility of reporting to the Congress.
13. Receive foreign diplomatic agents and authorize the consuls to exercise their functions.
14. Preside over the National Defense System; and organize, distribute and arrange the employment of the Armed Forces and the National Police.
15. Adopt the necessary measures for the defence of the Republic, the integrity of the territory and the sovereignty of the State.
16. Declare war and sign peace, with authorization from Congress.
17. Manage public finances.
18. Negotiate loans.
19. Dictate extraordinary measures, by emergency decrees with the force of law, in economic and financial matters, when the national interest requires it and with a charge of reporting to the Congress. Congress may modify or repeal the aforementioned emergency decrees.
20. Regulate tariff rates.
21. Grant pardons and commute sentences. Exercising the right of grace for the benefit of the accused in cases where the stage of instruction has exceeded twice its term plus its extension.
22. Confer decorations on behalf of the Nation.
23. Authorize Peruvians to serve in a foreign army.
24. Grant extradition, with the approval of the Council of Ministers, following a report from the Supreme Court of Justice of the Republic.
25. Preside over the Forum of the National Agreement, being able to delegate this function to the President of the Council of Ministers.
26. Exercise the other functions of government and administration that the Constitution and the laws entrust to it.

=== Previous constitutions ===
==== 1823 Constitution ====
The President is head of the general administration of the Republic, and their authority extends both to the preservation of public order internally, and to external security in accordance with the Constitution and laws. The duties exclusive to the President have been defined in the 1823 Constitution as:

1. To promulgate, execute, protect, and comply with the laws, decrees, and resolutions of the Congress of Peru and to issue the orders indispensable for its effect.
2. To have supreme command over the armed forces of Peru.
3. To order and verify democratic free elections on the days indicated by the Constitution.
4. To declare war when appropriate after being passed through the Congress of Peru.
5. To regulate and join peace treaties, alliances, and other agreements coming from foreign states according to the Constitution.
6. To oversee and determine the investment of the funds allocated by the Congress of Peru to the various branches of the public administration.
7. Appoint officers and officials of the Peruvian Armed Forces with the agreement and consent of Congress.
8. Appoint Ministers, members of the Presidential Cabinet, the Prime Minister, and diplomats with the agreement and consent of Congress.
9. Ensure the proper administration of justice in the Peruvian Judicial System and on the compliance of the judgments that they pronounce, as well as establish the trial by jury courts.
10. Inform the legislature of the political and military status quo of the Republic of Peru, indicating substantial improvements or suitable reforms in every branch of Peruvian society.

===== Limitations of the executive power =====
1. The President cannot and will not personally command the armed force without the consent of Congress.
2. The President cannot and will not leave the nation without permission from Congress.
3. Under no pretext can the President conduct business with members of the Supreme Court.
4. The President cannot and will not deprive any Peruvian of personal liberty, and if public security requires the arrest or detention of any person, the President may order the appropriate detention with the indispensable condition that within twenty-four hours the detainee will be available to their respective judge.
5. Furthermore, the President cannot and will not impose any penalties. The Minister who signed the order of detention, and the official who executes it can act on behalf of the detainee's individual freedom.
6. The President cannot and will not defer or suspend sessions of the Congress under any circumstances.

==== 1826 Constitution ====
The powers of the President of the Republic are:

1. Open sessions of the Congress, and present the legislative body a message about the State of the Republic yearly.
2. Propose the Vice President of Peru to Congress and appoint Secretaries of the Republic.
3. Dismiss the Vice President and Secretaries of the Republic, whenever the President deems it appropriate.
4. Send, publish, circulate, and enforce the laws.
5. Authorize the regulations and orders that maximizes compliance with the Constitution, laws and public treaties of the Republic.
6. Send and enforce the judgments of the Courts of Justice.
7. Request the extension of ordinary sessions of the Legislative Body for up to thirty days.
8. Convene the Legislative Body for extraordinary sessions, in a case where it is absolutely necessary.
9. To have the permanent force of the sea and land for exterior defense of the Republic.
10. To send in person the armies of the Republic in peace and in war. When the President is absent from the capital, the Vice President in charge of the Republic will take the duties and responsibilities of the President.
11. When the President leads the war in person, the President may reside in all the territory occupied by national arms.
12. Have the National Militia for internal security, within the limits of its departments and outside of them, with the consent of the Legislative Body.
13. Name all employees of the Army and Navy.
14. Establish military schools, and nautical schools.
15. Command to establish military hospitals and homes for the disabled.
16. Give withdrawals and licenses. Grant the pensions of the military and their families in accordance with the laws, and arrange, according to them, all the rest consequent to this branch.
17. Declare war on behalf of the Republic, after the decree of the Legislative Body.
18. Grant patents for privateering.
19. Take care of the collection and investment of contributions according to the laws.
20. Name employees.
21. Direct diplomatic negotiations, and celebrate treaties of peace, friendship, federation, alliance, truces, armed neutrality, trade, and any other, always having to precede the approval of the Legislative Body.
22. Appoint the Public Ministers, Consuls and subordinates of the Department of Foreign Affairs.
23. Receive foreign ministers.
24. Grant the pass, or suspend the conciliar decisions, pontifical, brief and resigned with the consent of the Power to whom it corresponds.
25. Propose to the Chamber of Censors, in short, individuals for the Supreme Court of Justice, and those who have to submit to the Archbishoprics, Bishoprics, Canongias and perks.
26. Present to the Senate for approval one of the list of candidates proposed by the Electoral Body for Prefects, Governors and Corregidores.
27. Choose one of the list of candidates proposed by the Ecclesiastical Government for priests and vicars of the provinces.
28. Suspend up to three months for employees, provided there is cause for it.
29. Commute the capital sentences decreed to the inmates by the Courts.
30. Issue, on behalf of the Republic, titles or appointments to all employees.

===== Limitations of executive power =====
1. The President may not deprive any Peruvian of their liberty, nor impose on them any penalty.
2. When the security of the Republic requires the arrest of one or more citizens, it may not exceed forty-eight hours without placing the accused at the disposal of the competent Court or Judge.
3. They may not deprive any individual of their property, but in the event that the public interest so requires, but they must precede a just compensation to the owner.
4. It will not be able to prevent the elections or the other functions that by the laws compete to the Powers of the Republic.
5. They cannot absent themselves from the territory of the Republic, nor from the capital, without permission from the Legislative Body.

==== 1860 Constitution ====
The powers of the President of the Republic are:

1. To preserve the internal order and the external security of the Republic without contravening the laws.
2. Convene the ordinary Congress and the extraordinary, when there is a need.
3. Concurring to the opening of the Congress, presenting a message about the state of the Republic and about the improvements and reforms it deems appropriate.
4. Take part in the formation of laws, in accordance with this constitution.
5. Enact and enforce the laws and other resolutions of the Congress; and give decrees, orders, regulations and instructions for their better compliance.
6. Give the necessary orders for the collection and investment of public revenues in accordance with the law.
7. Require judges and courts for the prompt and accurate administration of justice.
8. Enforce the judgments of the courts and courts.
9. Organize the forces of sea and land: distribute them, and dispose of them for the service of the Republic.
10. Have the National Guard in their respective provinces, without being able to remove them, but in case of sedition on the border, or in the war outside.
11. To direct diplomatic negotiations and to conclude treaties, placing on them the express condition that they will be submitted to the Congress.
12. Receive foreign Ministers and admit the Consuls.
13. Appoint and remove the Ministers of State and the Diplomatic Agents.
14. To clear licenses and pensions, according to the laws.
15. Exercise the Board in accordance with the laws and current practice.
16. Present to Archbishops and Bishops, with the approval of Congress, those who are elected according to the law.
17. Present for the Dignities and Canongias of the Cathedrals, for the parishes and other ecclesiastical benefits, in accordance with the laws and current practice.
18. Celebrate concordats with the Apostolic Chair, following the instructions given by Congress.
19. Grant or deny the passage to the conciliar decrees, papal bulls, briefs and rescripts, with the consent of the Congress, and previously hearing the Supreme Court of Justice, if they were related to contentious matters.
20. Provide vacant jobs, whose appointment corresponds according to the Constitution and special laws.

== Eligibility ==
=== Constitution of 1993 (contemporary) ===
According to the 1993 Constitution, in order to be eligible for the office, a presidential candidate must be:

- Peruvian by birth (those who are Peruvians by naturalization cannot access the position).
- More than thirty-five years of age at the time they start their campaign.
- Capable of fully exercising their civil rights, that is, they must not bear any penal sanction or civil declaration of disability, which includes the right to vote.

Certain officials who hold public office are ineligible to run as a candidate for the presidency or vice presidency under the Organic Law of Elections unless they have unless they have left office or resigned six months prior to the election. These offices include:

- The Ministers and Deputy Ministers of State, the Comptroller General of the Republic, and the regional authorities.
- The members of the Constitutional Court, the National Council of the Judiciary, the Judicial Power, the Public Ministry, the National Elections Jury, and the Ombuds.
- The President of the Central Reserve Bank, the Superintendent of Banking, Insurance and Private Administrators of Pension Funds and the National Superintendent of Tax Administration.
- Active duty members of the Armed Forces and the National Police.
- Other cases that the Constitution provides.

The prohibition on running for office also extends to the spouse and consanguineous relatives within the fourth degree, and other relatives within the second, of the incumbent President or any individual that has exercised the powers thereof in the year preceding the election.

=== Previous constitutions ===
The Constitution of 1823, the first constitution of this country, indicates that to be the President of Peru one must:

- Be a person born in Peru.
- Gather the same qualities as to be a leader.
- Be a citizen in practice.
- Be over 35 years old.
- Be from Peru.
- Have a property or income of eight hundred soles at least, or exercise any industry that yields them annually, or be a public professor of some science.

The Constitution of 1826, on the other hand, incorporating some subjective concepts, requires the following:

- Be a practicing citizen, and a native of Peru.
- Be over thirty years of age.
- Have done important services to the Republic.
- Have well-known talents in the administration of the State.
- Never have been convicted by the Courts, even for minor offenses.

The Constitution of 1856 states the requirements to be president: be Peruvian by birth, citizen in office and thirty-five years of age and ten of domicile in the Republic, which will remain virtually unchanged until today. As of 1979, the requirement of having resided in the country for the last ten years is eliminated.

== Inauguration ==
=== Setting and attendees ===
Presidential inaugurations take place in the Congress of the Republic of Peru in the capital city of Lima. Presidential inaugurations always take place on 28 July of its respective year, although in the case of constitutional succession, an inauguration is on the day that the presidential successor arrives in Lima. The presidential inauguration precedes a National Parade of the Military of Peru. Foreign dignitaries have often assisted the democratic transition of power in Peru.

=== Presidential oath ===
The contemporary placed presidential oath in Spanish is as follows:

Yo, [complete name of presidential elect], juro por Dios, por la patria, y por todos los peruanos que ejerceré fielmente el cargo de Presidente de la República que me ha confiado el nación para el periodo [start of mandate] a [end of mandate], que defenderé la soberanía nacional y la integridad física y moral de la República, que cumpliré y hare cumplir la constitución política y las leyes del Perú, y que reconocerá, respetando la libertad de corto, la importancia de la Iglesia Católica en la formación cultural y moral de los peruanos.

The English translation is as follows:

I, [complete name of presidential elect], swear to God, to the Homeland, and to all Peruvians that I will faithfully execute the office of President of the Republic of Peru that has been entrusted to me by the Nation for the period [start of mandate] to [end of mandate], that I will defend the sovereignty of the nation as well as the physical and moral integrity of the Nation, that I will comply and enforce the political constitution and laws of Peru, and that I will recognize, respecting freedoms, the importance of the Roman Catholic Church in the cultural and moral formation of Peruvians.

The president of Congress conventionally holds the presidential sash before the president-elect takes the oath of office. Once the president-elect has taken the oath of office, the president is recognized by all branches of the government of Peru as the democratic president of the Republic of Peru, symbolized by the president of the Congress passing the presidential sash. The nominee is recognized as the president of Peru with and only with the presidential sash.

As of 2019, there have been two illegitimate presidential inaugurations performed by the Congress of Peru, but not recognized by either the executive branch or the armed forces: one in 1992 during the Fujimorazo and the inauguration of Mercedes Aráoz in 2019 amidst a confrontation between the executive and legislative powers of Peru. There is also an emphasis on Christianity and the Roman Catholic Church in the oath of office. All presidents of Peru have been Catholic and have taken the oath of office alongside the Christian Bible, and in front of a Catholic Crucifix.

== Presidential symbols ==
=== Presidential sash ===
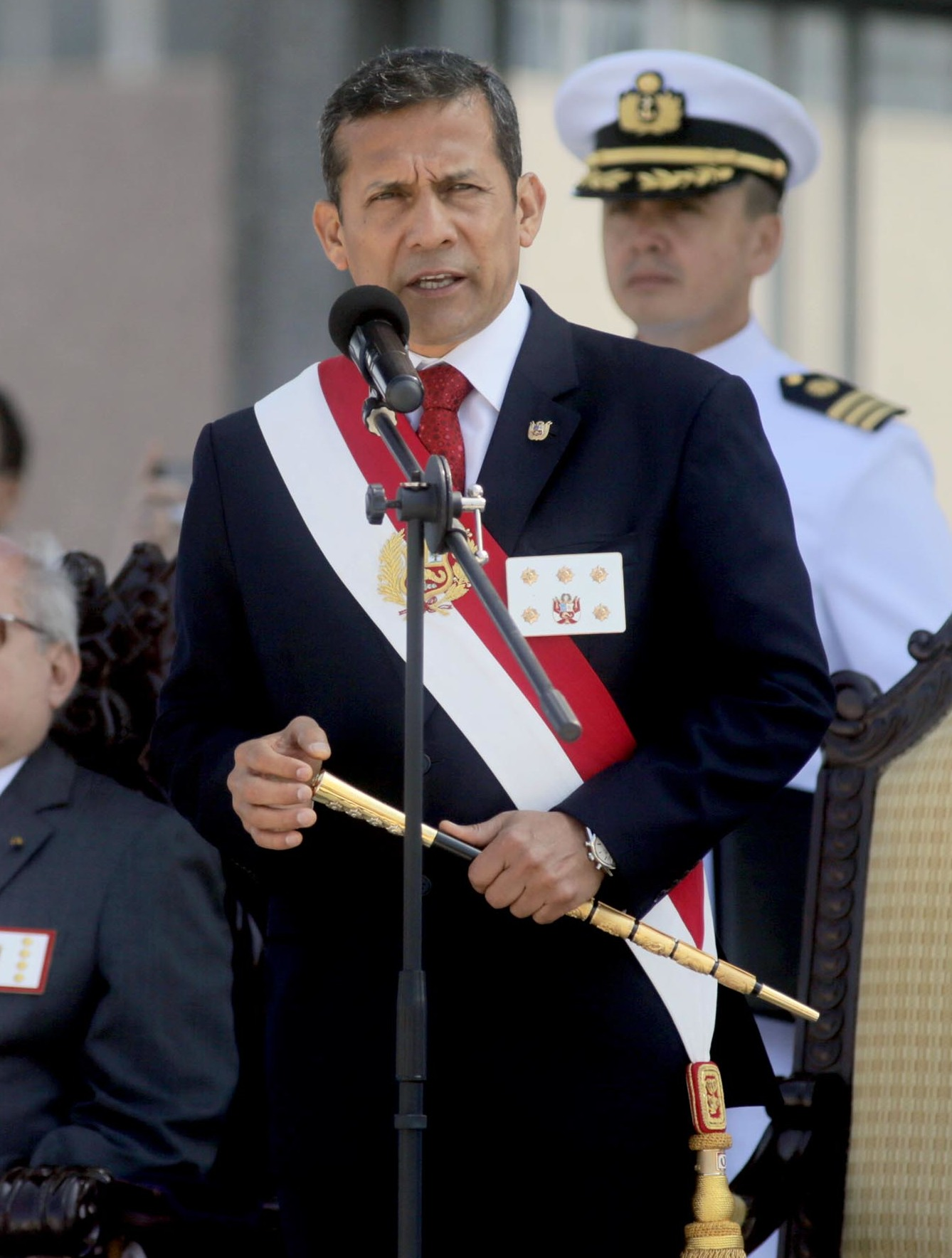
Former president Ollanta Humala using the presidential sash, plaque and baton

The presidential sash is the most distinctive feature that the President wears and has been used since the beginning of the Republic. It was inherited from the last Viceroys. The placement and delivery of the presidential sash symbolize a democratic transition of power. The band is used by the president of Congress until the new president is sworn in.

It is a bicolor band that carries the national colors (red and white). This band is worn diagonally from the right shoulder to the left side of the waist. At the waist, like a brooch, the band was embroidered in golden thread the Coat of arms of Peru. There is a Lima family that has traditionally made them. They are made to measure for each President and have been used normally with formal suit: suit, tuxedo or military uniform. Since 2006, the Shield was moved up to chest height.

The Ministers of State wear a red-and-white sash; Supreme Members, Congressmen of the Republic, Magistrates of the Constitutional Court, Members of the National Council of the Magistracy, Supreme Prosecutors, the Ombudsman, etc., wear red-and-white collars with medals that recognize them as such.

A possibly anecdotal tale involving the presidential sash was described by Ricardo Palma in his famous history, Peruvian Traditions. When confronted by an angry mob, President Justo Figuerola (1843) ended his first brief stint in the office by asking his daughter to take the presidential sash and tossing it out to the crowd from the balcony.

=== Plaque ===
The President of the Republic carries a plaque in the left upper pocket of the bag in the manner of a lanyard with the insignia of the military command that recognizes them as the Supreme Chief of the Armed Forces. It is the heir of the distinctive and military honors worn by presidents belonging to the Armed Forces throughout the history of the country. It is golden and has the shape of a radiant sun.

=== Staff ===
The staff originates from the Spanish custom of symbolizing power with a cane. The custom was introduced in the eighteenth century in the Andes, after the rebellion of José Gabriel Túpac Amaru and Túpac Catari in 1780 to represent the dignity of mayor of Incas. Unlike Argentina, the use of a cane that symbolizes the power and office of President (symbolically, varayoc), has not been common in the history of the Peruvian presidency and has been replaced innumerable times by the saber or the sword of the military presidents. There is only a handful of remarkable cases. Mariano Ignacio Prado, José Balta and Augusto B. Leguía used it in pictures and presidential photographs. Recently, Alejandro Toledo, made use of the cane in his symbolic assumption to the charge in Cusco and also on a few other occasions. Its most recent use corresponds to 29 July 2011, the date of the traditional military parade, when Ollanta Humala carried a small presidential staff, the same one used by Alan García in the military parade on 29 July 2008.

== Post-presidency ==
With the exception of Fernando Belaúnde, all former elected presidents of Peru since 1975 have been prosecuted since leaving office:

- Francisco Morales Bermúdez, who was president from 1975 to 1980, was sentenced to life in prison by an Italian court in January 2017.
- Prior to his resignation/impeachment in 2000, Alberto Fujimori escaped to Japan seeking political refuge. While there he unsuccessfully attempted to run for a parliamentary position in the National Diet. He returned to Latin America to run for the 2006 presidential elections. His flight was diverted to Chile, where he stayed for six days. Peruvian officials and the President of Peru expressed discontent at Chilean officials for allowing the indicted former president into the continent without repercussion. Ultimately, Fujimori flew back to Peru for unstated reasons and was arrested. Fujimori was convicted of corruption, bribery, human rights violations, crimes against humanities, murder, and other charges, for 25 years of prison until 2031. Fujimori served his sentence until 2017, where then Peruvian President Pedro Pablo Kuczynski issued a presidential pardon, clearing Fujimori of his conviction. Following the resignation of Kuczynski, the pardon was declared illegitimate in 2019 and Fujimori was arrested and returned to confinement. The pardon was reinstated in 2023 and Fujimori was ultimately again released in December of that year, nine months before his death.
- Following the end of his term in 2006, Alejandro Toledo abruptly withdrew from Peruvian politics. Toledo and his spouse, Eliane Karp, both moved to California, in the United States, to avoid prosecution. Toledo and his wife were charged with multiple offenses of corruption and probing, and have been summoned to Peru for a trial. Toledo ignored this warning and proceeded to remain in the United States. Toledo claimed to have been a professor at Stanford University, but the university verified that Toledo was solely invited as a one-time guest speaker to the institution. Many efforts were made to extradite Toledo, but no responses were heard from the United States government. In March 2019, Toledo was temporarily arrested for public drunkenness in California, and was released later that night. Via a call in, Toledo denied that he was arrested. There is currently a $25,000 reward for the ex-president. In August 2019, Toledo was arrested in Northern California as part of an extradition request from the Ministry of Justice of Peru. He was held in custody until he was extradited in June 2023.
- Ollanta Humala and his wife, Nadine Heredia, were abruptly arrested following the end of his term. Both of them were detained for 6 months for investigation on the means of corruption, but were later released. There were no conclusions or evidence provided by the investigation. Humala continues to reside in Lima awaiting his trial.
- Following his resignation in March 2018, Pedro Pablo Kuczynski quietly left the Government Palace and returned to his home in the district of San Isidro. Kuczynski remained out of the public eye for the following ten months, but was then summoned to the Department of Justice. All of Kuczynski's bank accounts were frozen and he was prohibited from leaving the country. Kuczynski made few public appearances, but on the first anniversary of his resignation, Kuczynski made his first major public appearance on El Comercio, a major Peruvian newspaper. The former president mentioned his present financial ruins and the amounts of loans he was forced to make. Additionally, Kuczynski mentioned that he felt betrayed by Martin Vizcarra, the incumbent President of Peru who succeeded Kuczynski following his resignation. On 10 April 2019, Kuczynski was arrested for primary corruption charges on the basis of an ongoing investigation into his connections with Odebrecht, money laundering, and bribery. At the end of his detention, Kuczynski was sentenced to three years of house imprisonment until 2022.
- Martín Vizcarra faced several allegations of corruption following his impeachment and was banned from public office for ten years in 2021 due to his involvement in Vacunagate.
- Manuel Merino was president for five days from 10 to 15 November 2020, following the impeachment and removal of Martín Vizcarra by the Peruvian Congress, before stepping down amid widespread protests resulting in casualties. He was inaugurated as president following the line of succession established in the constitution. After his presidency, he was investigated for human rights violations that occurred during mass protests.
- Alan García faced an investigation due to his alleged involvement in the Odebrecht scandal. While police in violation of his right to a fair trial illegally attempted to arrest him in April 2019, Garcia committed suicide.
- Pedro Castillo was removed from office following a failed self-coup attempt and was arrested while attempting to flee towards the Mexican embassy in Lima. Currently, Castillo is imprisoned for charges of rebellion, while also facing several corruption investigations.
- Dina Boluarte is facing an investigation for genocide and crimes against humanity due to her administration's harsh response to social unrest.

== Demographics of the presidents ==
In contemporary history, three presidents are known not to have been of direct Peruvian descent, being Alberto Fujimori (1990–2000), Pedro Pablo Kuczynski (2016–2018) and Keiko Fujimori (2026-). Both Alberto and Keiko Fujimori are of Japanese descent and Kuczynski is of German, Jewish, French and Polish descent. A majority of presidents have been born in Lima. Three presidents have been assassinated in Peru's history—Felipe Santiago Salaverry (1835–1836), Tomás Gutiérrez (1872), and Luis Miguel Sánchez Cerro (1931–1933). Two presidents died in office of natural causes—Remigio Morales Bermúdez (1890–1894) and Manuel Candamo (1903–1904). One president, Alan García (1985–1990, 2006–2011), committed suicide.

The tallest recorded president is Alan García, who stood at 1.93 m. The shortest is Alejandro Toledo (2001–2006), who stands at 1.65 m. The oldest person to assume the presidency was José María Balcázar (2026–2026) who assumed the presidency at 83 years and 32 days, with the second-oldest being Pedro Pablo Kuczynski (2016–2018) who assumed the presidency at 78 years and 217 days, and the third-oldest being Fernando Belaunde Terry (1963–1968, 1980–1985) who assumed his second presidency at 78 years and 39 days. The president who has reached the longest life span is Francisco Morales Bermúdez (1975–1980), who lived to be 100. Three Peruvian presidents lived into their nineties:

- Francisco Morales Bermúdez (4 October 1921 – 14 July 2022) (age 100 years, 283 days), the longest-lived Peruvian President and Prime Minister
- José Luis Bustamante y Rivero (15 January 1894 – 11 January 1989) (age 94 years, 362 days)
- Manuel María Ponce Brousset (5 April 1874 – 18 July 1966) (age 92 years, 104 days)

The youngest person to assume the presidency was Felipe Santiago Salaverry who came to office at the age of 28 years and 248 days, with the second youngest being Alan García who was 36 years and 66 days at the start of his first term.

Keiko Fujimori became the first elected female president of Peru and only the second female to serve as president after Dina Boluarte (2022-2025) assumed office following the impeachment of Pedro Castillo.

== Line of succession ==
Names of incumbents as of 2026:

President of the Republic: Keiko Fujimori

1. First Vice President: Luis Galarreta
2. Second Vice President and President of the Senate: Miki Torres
3. President of Congress: Miki Torres

== See also ==
- Prime Minister of Peru
- List of presidents of Peru
