= José de la Mar =

President of Peru from 1827 to 1829

José de La Mar
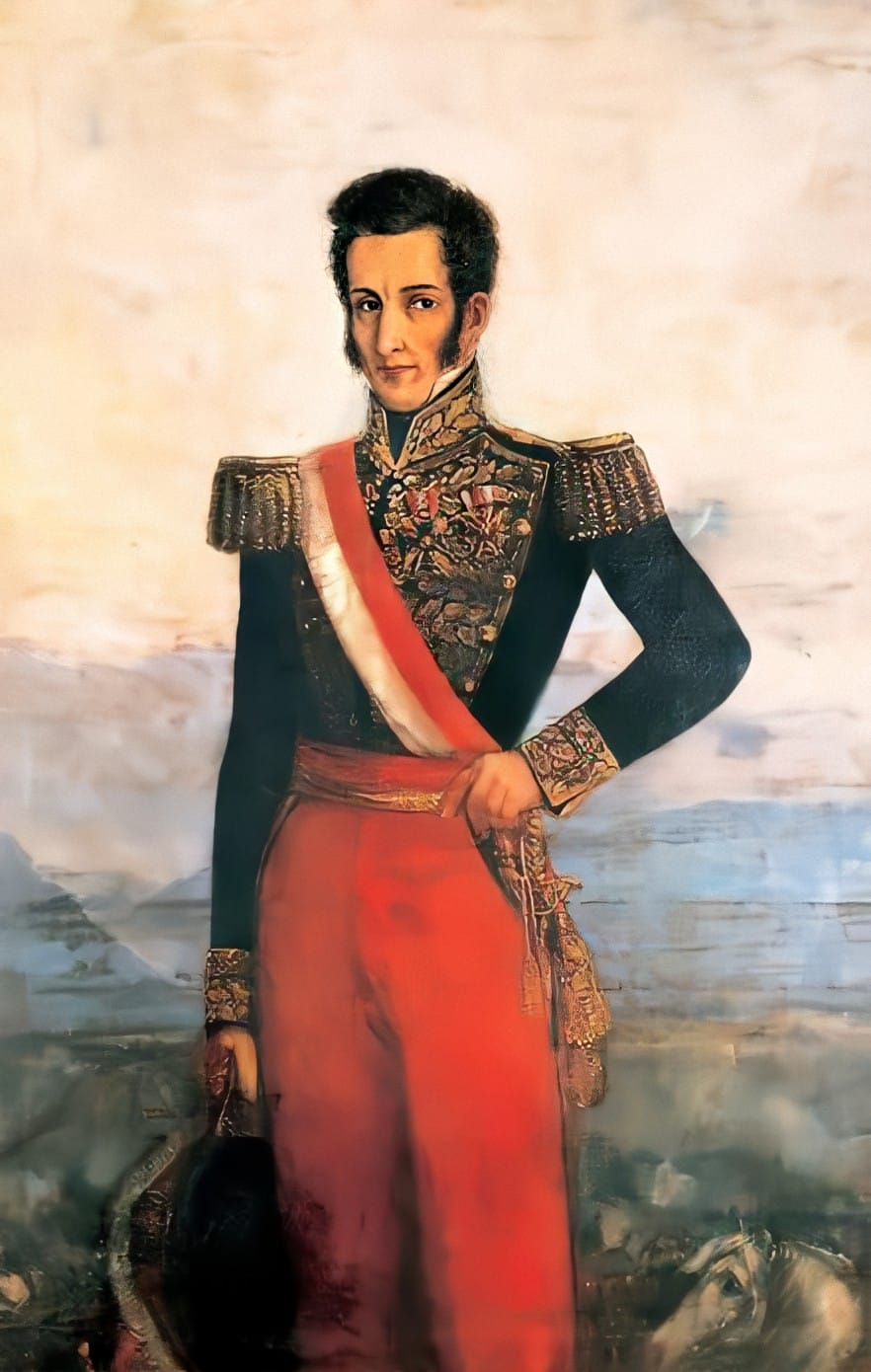

3rd President of Peru
- In office 22 August 1827 – 7 June 1829
- Vice President: Manuel Salazar y Baquíjano
- Preceded by: Manuel Salazar y Baquíjano
- Succeeded by: Antonio Gutiérrez de la Fuente

President of the Supreme Governing Junta
- In office 21 September 1822 – 27 February 1823
- Vice President: Manuel Salazar y Baquíjano; Felipe Antonio Alvarado
- Preceded by: José de San Martín
- Succeeded by: José Bernardo de Tagle

Personal details
- Born: 12 May 1776 Cuenca, Real Audiencia de Quito (now Ecuador)
- Died: 11 October 1830 (aged 54) San José, Costa Rica
- Profession: Soldier, Politician

José Domingo de la Merced de La Mar y Cortázar (Cuenca (Ecuador),12 May 1776 – San José (Costa Rica), 11 October 1830) was a Peruvian military leader and politician who served as the third President of Peru.

== Biography ==
=== Youth ===
José de La Mar was born on 12 May 1776, at Cuenca in what today is Ecuador. As son of Marcos de La Mar y Migura (1736–1794) and his wife Josefa Paula Cortázar y Lavayen (1748–1815), he spent his early childhood in Spain.

=== Military career in Spain, France and Peru (1794–1820) ===
With the help of his influential uncle, La Mar entered the Spanish army as a second lieutenant of the regiment of Savoy. In 1794 he participated in the campaign of Roussillon against the French Republic, fighting under the command of the Count of the Union, after which he was promoted to captain (1795). Then he participated in various military actions against revolutionary France, and was already a lieutenant-colonel by the start of Spain's national war against Napoleon's invasion (1808). He participated in the defense of Zaragoza under command of Colonel Palafox (1808–1809). He was seriously injured, and although that city finally capitulated, earned the title of "Hero of the Nation" (Benemérito de la Patria en grado heroico) and was promoted to colonel.

In 1812 he transferred to the front of Valencia, led by General Joaquín Blake, and sent a column of 4,000 veterans grenadiers (the "column La Mar"). Again he was wounded, and was taken to hospital in Tudela, where he was captured by the French. As soon as he was recovered, he was taken to France and confined in the castle of Semur-en-Auxois (Burgundy), where he studied the classics of French culture. After a time, he managed to escape, accompanied by Brigadier Juan María Muñoz y Manito, crossed into Switzerland and then Tyrol and reached the port of Trieste, on the Adriatic Sea, where he sailed back to Spain.

In 1815, Ferdinand VII promoted him to Brigadier, awarded him the Saint Hermenegildo's Cross and appointed him Sub-Inspector of the Viceroyalty of Peru, with the title of Governor of Callao. He arrived at the city in 1816. In 1819, he was promoted to Mariscal de campo.

=== The War of Independence (1821–1825) ===
The Royalist Cause

During the early days of the Peruvian War of Independence, he remained loyal to the King, and defended the Real Felipe Fortress in Callao, the main port of the Viceroyalty, for the Royalists. He repelled a naval attack by the Patriots under command of Thomas Cochrane in March 1819 and again in September 1819 and October 1820.

In 1821, rebel troops advanced towards Lima and Viceroy José de la Serna abandoned the capital on 6 June 1821, leaving De la Mar with explicit orders to resist and wait for reinforcements. He successfully withstood all attempts to capture the fort for nearly 4 months. A Royalist relief army, under command of General José de Canterac was not able to break the siege or to ship supplies and troops into the fortress, and retreated into the mountains. On 19 September, La Mar and his garrison were forced to surrender, due to the lack of supplies. Only two days later, La Mar finally submitted his left foot to amputation, having initially refused treatment of a gangrenous toe.

The Rebel Cause

After the Baquijano Capitulation at Callao, La Mar joined forces with the rebel cause. José de San Martín awarded him with the title of "Division General", a title he accepted reluctantly. In March 1822, he was made a Grand Marshal of Peru.

La Mar served as one of three men on the Supreme Governing Junta of the Republic of Peru from 22 September 1822 to 27 February 1823. He made strenuous efforts to obtain financing for an expedition to take the southern ports of Peru. Under the command of General Rudecindo Alvarado, an army marched south, but was completely defeated at the Battles of Torata and Moquegua. The Royalist general José de Canterac, seeing the city of Lima defenseless, descended from the central mountains and occupied the Peruvian capital easily. The resounding failure of the expedition dented the trust that Peruvian politicians had placed in La Mar. Congress, at the insistence of the Peruvian army, dissolved the Supreme Government Board and relieved the triumvirate of all its political responsibilities. La Mar served as the President of the Congress from November 1823 to December 1823.

La Mar resumed his military functions with the arrival of Simón Bolívar in Peru, who commissioned him to form and train new troops in Trujillo (1824). Having completed the assignment successfully, Bolívar entrusted La Mar with command of the Peruvian Division of the Liberation Army.

Bolívar ordered the final attack on the Royalist troops and led the Patriot armies to the mountains of Peru. Both armies met on the pampas of Junín (6 August 1824), and La Mar had a decisive role in leading the attack that gave victory to the Patriot side in the Battle of Junín. He played the same role in the Battle of Ayacucho (9 December 1924), since it was his directives that inflicted the final defeat on the Spanish and the achievement of Peru's independence.

=== Independent Peru ===
With the Royalist troops removed from the former Peruvian viceroyalty, Bolívar created the Government Junta (1825), which was to replace him in his functions for the leadership of the State, while he traveled to Colombia. José de La Mar was appointed, along with José Faustino Sánchez Carrión and Hipólito Unanue, as one of three men in charge of directing the government. La Mar was president of said board only between 5 January and 25 February 1826, since his serious health condition prevented him from continuing in the direction of Peruvian politics. With medical leave, La Mar immediately retired to Guayaquil in search of a calm and peaceful environment.

La Mar returned as the Constitutional President of the Republic of Peru from 22 August 1827 to 7 June 1829. During the two years that his presidency lasted, La Mar had to face several uprisings, conspiracies and two armed conflicts: one with the new Republic of Bolivia and one with Gran Colombia.

He was removed from the Presidency of Peru after less than two years by a coup d'état led by General Agustín Gamarra and died in forced exile in Costa Rica, on 11 October 1830.

Political offices
Preceded by Francisco Xavier de Luna Pizarro	President of the Government Junta; 1822–1823	Succeeded by José Bernardo de Tagle y Portocarrero, Marquis of Torre Tagle
Preceded by Manuel Salazar y Baquíjano	President of Peru; 1827–1829	Succeeded by Antonio Gutiérrez de la Fuente
