= Batallón Voltígeros de la Guardia =

Spanish American military unit

Voltigeurs of the Guard
- Voltígeros de la Guardia
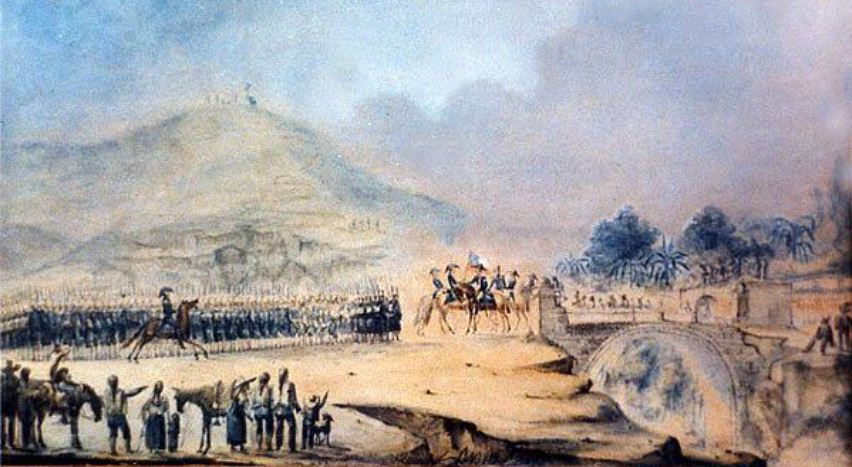
- Painting by Bernardo O’Higgins of the Battalion switching sides under José de San Martín
- Active: 1813–1831
- Countries: Spanish Empire (1813–20); Liberating Expedition of Peru (1820–21); Republic of Colombia (1821–31)
- Part of: Spanish Army (1813–20); Army of the Andes (from 1820)
- Engagements: Spanish American wars of independence: Peruvian War of Independence; Battle of Ayacucho; Venezuelan War of Independence

The Voltigeurs of the Guard Battalion (Spanish: Batallón Voltígeros de la Guardia), originally formed as the Numancia Battalion (Spanish: Batallón Numancia), was a battalion of the Spanish American troops of the Spanish Army formed by Pablo Morillo in Venezuela to reinforce the Spanish Army in Peru Viceroyalty during the Spanish American wars of independence. The Numancia marched on foot—an arduous journey of over 3,600 km from New Granada—crossing the Province of Quito and arriving in Lima in February 1819. They subsequently moved to Trujillo, where the 5th and 6th companies, which were severely understrength, filled their ranks with Peruvian recruits. At that time, the unit commanded by Lieutenant Colonel Roberto Delgado decide to join the Patriot governments by crossing the Huaura River on December 2, 1820.

Once the army was formally incorporated in Huaura, it changed its name and went on to fight in the Peruvian War of Independence, most notably in the decisive Battle of Ayacucho, which consolidated the country's independence that was first declared in 1821.

== See also ==
- Peruvian War of Independence
- Venezuelan War of Independence
