= United Liberating Army of Peru =

Military unit of Peru

United Liberating Army of Peru (1820-24) or United Peruvian–Colombian Liberating Army of Peru (1824-27)
- Ejército Unido Libertador del Perú (1820-24) o Ejército Unido Peruano Colombiano libertador del Perú (1824-1827)
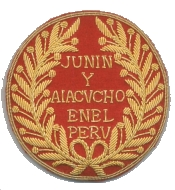
- Commemorative patch
- Active: 1820–1827
- Countries: Chile, Colombia, Peru, United Provinces of the Río de la Plata
- Allegiance: Peru
- Type: Army
- Role: Land warfare
- Size: 6,000–13,000
- Engagements: Peruvian War of Independence

Commanders
- Notable commanders: José de San Martín (1820); Rudecindo Alvarado (1822); Andrés de Santa Cruz (1823); Simón Bolívar (1824); Antonio José de Sucre (1824)

The United Liberating Army of Peru (Spanish: Ejército Unido Libertador del Perú), known after the Callao uprising as the United Peruvian–Colombian Liberating Army of Peru (Spanish: Ejército Unido peruano colombiano Libertador del Perú), was an army during the Peruvian War of Independence that had its origin in the Liberating Expedition of Peru, under the command of José de San Martín in 1820.

Successively, new Peruvian regiments were created, organized until the end of the war, and which are the origin of the Peruvian Army. Units from the royalist side also switched sides, such as the Numancia Regiment. These troops were led by generals Rudecindo Alvarado and Andrés de Santa Cruz in the successive campaigns against the ports of southern Peru. Finally, in 1823, the newly arrived units of the army of Gran Colombia under the command of Simón Bolívar joined this United Liberating Army. This Peruvian-Colombian army was commanded by Antonio José de Sucre in the final Ayacucho campaign.

Peru, following the Fall of Callao in 1826, achieved full sovereignty only after the end of Simon Bolívar's influence and the Gran Colombian military occupation. His Federation of the Andes project was discarded and the last Gran Colombian garrison returned the Real Felipe Fortress to the Peruvians on 16 February 1827.

== See also ==
- Peruvian War of Independence
- Royal Army of Peru
