= Ocoña District =

Coordinates: 16.4318°S 73.1118°W

Ocoña
- District
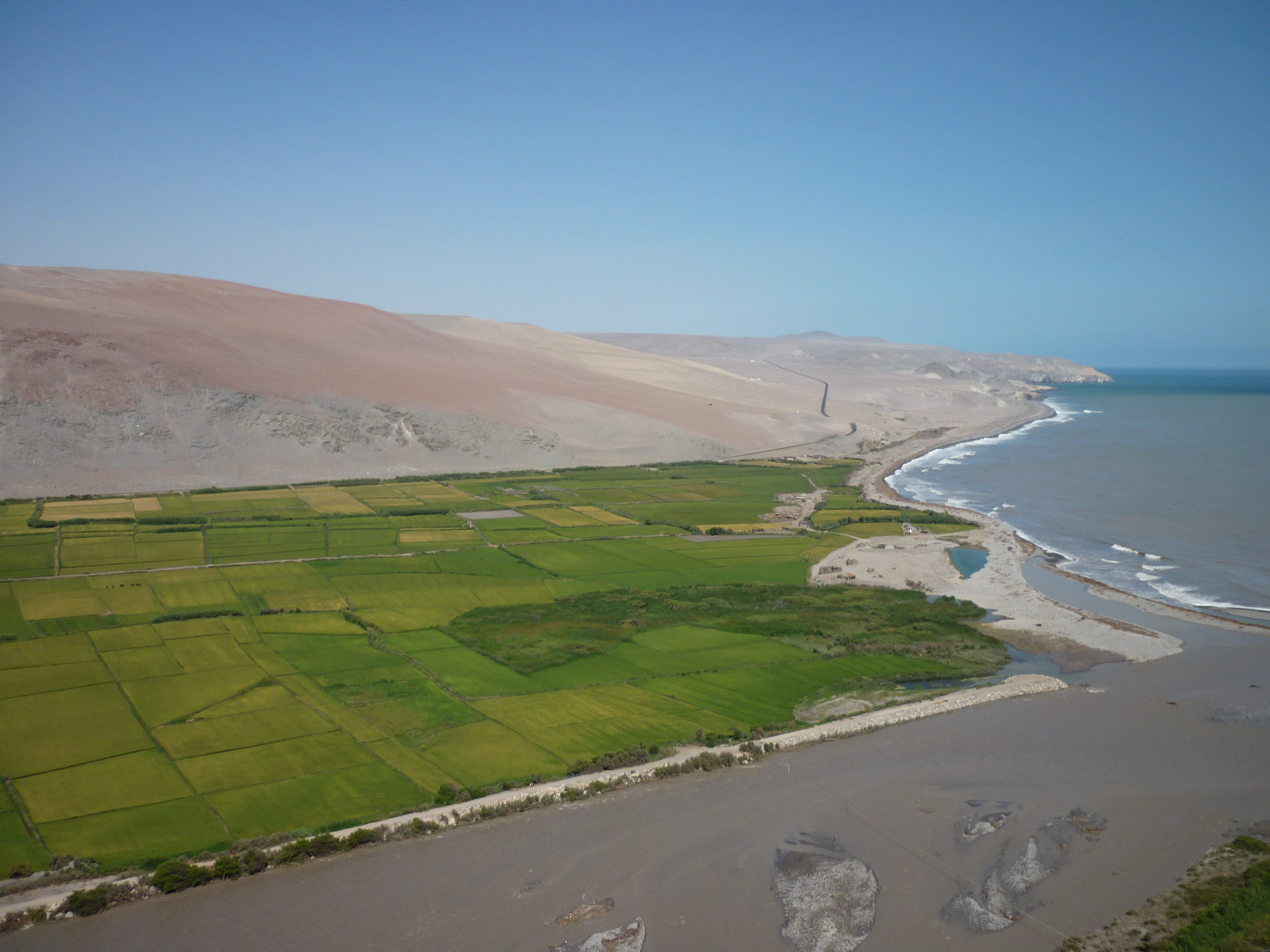
- Mouth of Ocoña River
- Interactive map of Ocoña
- Country: Peru
- Region: Arequipa
- Province: Camaná
- Founded: January 2, 1857
- Capital: Ocoña

Government
  - Mayor: Marilú Janeth González Porras (2019-2022)

Area
  - Total: 1,415.1 km^{2} (546.4 sq mi)
- Elevation: 12 m (39 ft)

Population (2017)
  - Total: 4,171
  - Density: 2.947/km^{2} (7.634/sq mi)
- Time zone: UTC-5 (PET)
- UBIGEO: 040206

Ocoña District is one of eight districts of the province Camaná in Peru. Its seat is Ocoña.

== See also ==
- Ocoña River
