= Patriot governments =

Spanish American wars, 1808 and 1825

The term "Patriots" is used to refer to supporters of Spanish American independence and of their governments that emerged during the revolutions between 1808 and 1825.

Congress and independence declarations

Spanish Dominions	Year	Date	Independence declarations	Country
Captaincy General of Venezuela	1811	July 5	Acta de la Declaración de Independencia de Venezuela, First Republic of Venezuela	Venezuela
Viceroyalty of New Granada	1811	July 15	First Republic of New Granada, Constitución de Cundinamarca, United Provinces of New Granada	Colombia
Viceroyalty of New Granada	1811	September 11	Independencia de Cartagena, Estado Libre de Cartagena	Colombia
Viceroyalty of Rio de la Plata	1813	January 31	Asamblea General Constituyente del Año 1813 Provincias Unidas del Río de la Plata	Argentina and Uruguay
Province Misiones Guaraníes of Viceroyalty of Rio de la Plata	1813	October 12	Primera constitución Paraguay	Paraguay
Viceroyalty of New Spain	1813	September 13	Acta Solemne de la Declaración de Independencia de la América Septentrional, Congress of Chilpancingo	Mexico
Province Montevideo of Viceroyalty of Rio de la Plata	1815	Jun 29	Congreso de Oriente, Liga Federal	Uruguay
Viceroyalty of Río de la Plata	1816	Jun 29	Argentine Declaration of Independence, Congress of Tucumán	Argentina
Captaincy General of Chile	1818	February 12	Chilean Declaration of Independence	Chile
Viceroyalty of New Granada and Captaincy General of Venezuela	1819	December 17	Congress of Cúcuta, Gran Colombia	Gran Colombia
Province of Guayaquil of Viceroyalty of Peru	1820	November 8	Independencia de Guayaquil	Free Province of Guayaquil, Annexed by Gran Colombia
Viceroyalty of Peru	1821	July 28	Declaración de Independencia, Constituent Congress of Peru (1822)	Peru
Captaincy General of Guatemala	1821	September 15	Act of Independence of Central America	Federal Republic of Central America
Province of New Spain (Mexico)	1821	September 28	Declaration of Independence of the First Mexican Empire, Junta Provisional Gubernativa	(First Mexican Empire) Mexico
Provincia del Istmo and Provincia de Veragua of Viceroyalty of New Granada	1821	November 28	Independence Act of Panama	, Panama part of Gran Colombia
Province of Charcas of Viceroyalty of Río de la Plata	1825	August 6	Bolivian Declaration of Independence, Asamblea General de Diputados de las Provincias del Alto Perú	Bolivia

== See also ==
- Hispanic America
