= Constituent Congress of Peru (1822) =

The Constituent Congress of Peru, 1822 was the first democratically elected institution in Peru. Its members, called deputies, were appointed by popular election called by the liberator José de San Martín, who then exercised power as Protector of Peru. The main task of this meeting was to give the Republic of Peru its first constitution, which was the liberal constitution of 1823. Also, before the retirement of San Martín, presented the Executive to three members, who formed a collegial body called the Supreme Governing Junta and whose head was General José de la Mar. It was subsequently ratified in succession to the former presidents of the Republic of Peru: José de la Riva Agüero and José Bernardo de Tagle (better known as the Marquis of Torre Tagle).

== Background ==
After the proclamation of the independence of Peru, the ancient capital of the Viceroyalty of Peru, Lima, on July 28, 1821, General José de San Martín assumed command of the military political free departments of Peru, under the title protector, according to the decree of August 3, 1821.

San Martín was the one who gave the state its first Peruvian flag, anthem, currency, and its administration and its first primitive institutions. But it remained to give a Constitution and meanwhile, a temporary regulation was imposed, later replaced by a statute.

On December 27, 1821, San Martín called for the first time the people to choose freely a Constituent Congress, with the mission to establish the form of government that henceforth would govern Peru, and a proper constitution.

== Installation ==
On September 20, 1822, a year and a month after Independence, the first Constituent Congress of Peru, composed of 79 deputies (elected) and 38 alternates (for realistic territories), officially opened its first session. Its members had the most prominent members of the clergy, the forum, letters and sciences. Before this Congress, San Martín resigned the protectorate and later left Peru for Chile, leaving the new nation at the hands of this new legislature, which opened at the campus of the National University of San Marcos in the capital, having came there just in time as one of his final acts as head of state. Congress express its collective gratitude to him for being the Father of Peruvian Independence and Proclaimer of Independent Peru the year before.

For the preparatory meetings, the Congress elected Toribio Rodríguez de Mendoza, the precursor of independence, the same who had been rector of Convictorio of San Carlos, where he trained in the philosophy of enlightenment to the generation of Independence. Much of his former students now were included as deputies.

Elected as the first President of the Congress was the elected deputy from Arequipa Francisco Xavier de Luna Pizarro, and secretaries José Faustino Sánchez Carrión – author of the famous letters of "El Perro", which called for the federal republic form of government, and Francisco Javier Mariátegui, also a liberal.

== Appointment of the Governing Junta ==
With San Martin no longer head of state, one of the first priorities of Congresss was to delegate the now vacant executive power to a group of three members, who formed a collegial body called the Supreme Governing Junta (chaired by José de La Mar with Manuel Salazar, Antonio Alvarado and Felipe Baquíjano acting as members). The Junta took office on September 21, 1822.

On November 4, Congress agreed thanksgiving to Lord Thomas Cochrane, Colombia, the Liberation Army, Chile and the Supreme Director and expressed its appreciation to the indigenous guerrillas and even the natural forest for their services in favor of independence. It also gave broad amnesty, even to the Spanish. The only exception was the former minister Bernardo de Monteagudo, who was banned, establishing penalties for authorities to allow him to live freely in their districts.

On November 22, Congress gave the coup de grâce to the monarchical illusion pursued by San Martín to make Peru a modern successor to the Incan Empire. Congress, in its decision to declare Peru a republic, overruled the Commission of Juan Garcia del Río and James Paroissien, both of whom had been sent to Europe to find a king for Peru and on 22 December of that year, the Congress established the "Bases of the Constitution" which, among the many reforms decreed the end of the slave trade in Peru.

The meeting was also devoted to the organization of the country into departments, provinces and districts.

== Political and military crisis ==
The main task of the legislators, that is drafting the first Constitution of independent Peru and legislative work was hampered by the difficult circumstances that arose in late 1822 and early 1823. There were no resources to pay salaries to military and civilian employees, and around the capital were ravaged by bandits. As for the war against the Spanish who still held out in southern Peru, the Governing Junta decided to conduct the military plan of San Martín, to attack the royalists from South intermediate ports. But it needed outside military help.

Indeed, it was already underway to support the Northern Liberator, Simón Bolívar, head of Gran Colombia, who had helped Peru to defeat the Spanish who were left throughout southern Peru, including what is now Bolivia. During the Guayaquil conference, Bolívar, San Martín had offered military aid to Peru, which was founded in July 1822 with the dispatch of Colombian troops under the command of Juan Paz del Castillo. In September of that year, Bolívar returned to offer another 4,000 troops, but the brand new Governing Junta accepted the reception of only 4,000 rifles. Relations between Peru and Gran Colombia entered its most critical point due to the annexation of Guayaquil to Colombian territory. Added to that were the instructions he had received from Juan Paz del Castillo, not to commit their forces in case they were guaranteed success only in northern Peru. He soon came into conflict with the interests of Peru and Colombia and returned home in January 1823.

Relations with Gran Colombia cooled, then, at the very moment when the campaign was being waged Intermediate. This expedition ended in failure after the defeat of the patriot army in Torata and Moquegua (19 and 21 January 1823). From then dates the letrilla burlesque to the Spanish Congress that spread from their camp situated a short distance from Lima:

Congresito ¿cómo estamos
con el tris tras de Moquegua?
De aquí a Lima hay una legua.
¿Te vas? ¿Te vienes? ¿Nos vamos?

Congress and the Governing Junta were so terribly discredited in public opinion. The patriotic officers commanding the troops that guarded Lima, fearing a Spanish offensive, signed a petition to Congress, dated February 23, 1823 in Miraflores, invoking the name of one Supreme Head "to order and be quickly obeyed", replacing the collegial body that belonged to the Junta, even suggested the name of the officer to assume the government stated: Colonel José de la Riva Agüero y Sánchez Boquete.

The crisis deepened when another petition to Congress was presented by the civic militia stationed in Bellavista and a third headed by Mariano Tramarría. On February 27 troops moved from their quarters to the estate of Balconcillo, half a league from Lima, where they demanded the dismissal of the Junta. These rebels were led by General Andrés de Santa Cruz. It was the first coup in the republican history of Peru, known as the Balconcillo Mutiny.

Given the pressure that day, Congress agreed to dismiss the Governing Junta and an interim order to the highest office highest-ranking military leader was José Bernardo de Tagle. On February 28, Congress ordered to release to General José de La Mar, who had been arrested at his home, citing General Andrés de Santa Cruz, who made an oral presentation of the position of the heads and concluded that Congress obeyed the order but if not named José de la Riva Agüero as president, he and military leaders would resign and would leave the country. Given the statement made by Santa Cruz, Congress named Riva Agüero as president by 39 votes for a total of 60, not assigned duties and deadlines. Previously Riva Agüero was promoted to the rank of Grand Marshal.

Such events divided Congress. Some Members felt that he had exerted pressure on the so-called "sovereign Congress", which was inadmissible and many of them did not return to session. The Congress president, Francisco Xavier de Luna Pizarro, exiled himself in protest. From that time began to coexist two major factions: the realistic or Spanish and separatist or patriot. The separatist or patriot was divided initially into republicans and monarchists, the latter being discarded, was divided into parliamentary and liberal caudillo.

Riva Agüero thus became the first president of the Peruvian Republic, though elected de facto. This person would conclude without foreign aid the war of independence of Peru, which organized the Second Intermediate Campaign, which, like the first, ended in failure.

Discord soon broke out between Congress and Riva Agüero. Congress ruled that Trujillo be moved to the executive and legislative branches also created a military power confided to Venezuelan General Antonio José de Sucre (who had arrived in Peru in May of that year), and sent a delegation to Colombia to request personal collaboration of Simón Bolívar in the war against the Spanish (June 19, 1823). Next, Congress granted the same powers Sucre equal to those of President for the duration of the crisis, and on June 23 ruled that remain exempt from Riva Agüero supreme command.

Riva Agüero did not comply with that provision and Trujillo sailed with part of the authorities. He kept his inauguration as president, ordered the dissolution of Congress (July 19), created a Senate of ten members and organized troops. While in Lima, Congress was again called by the provisional president José Bernardo de Tagle, the August 6, 1823. The Congress recognized Tagle as President of the Republic.

In the midst of this grave crisis, in which two presidents vied for power, Tagle Constitution promulgated on 12 November 1823. Soon after Riva Agüero was arrested and deported, unifying control of the country and around Bolívar, while Tagle was reduced to figurehead.

== The Constitution of 1823 ==
The main work of the Constituent Congress was undoubtedly drafting the first Constitution of independent Peru, which was inspired by liberal ideas.

The first step was the development of the "Bases of the Constitution" at the hands of a congressional committee, composed of the deputies Justo Figuerola, Francisco Xavier de Luna Pizarro, José Joaquín de Olmedo, Manuel Perez de Tudela and Hipólito Unanue. These "bases" were issued by the Governing Junta on December 17, 1822, consisted of 24 items, which broadly stated that all the provinces of Peru, gathered in one body, formed the Peruvian nation, that from then be called "Republic of Peru", also stated that sovereignty resided in the nation, and is independent of the Spanish monarchy and any other foreign domination would be the Catholic religion to the exclusion of any other, and as for the National Power, would be divided into three branches, Legislative, Executive and Judicial.

Discussed the Constitution, was approved and promulgated by President Torre Tagle, the November 12, 1823. But a day earlier, the Congress ordered the suspension of his articles that were inconsistent with the powers granted to the liberator Bolívar, who was already under way to establish the dictatorship. In practice it was in effect for the duration of the Bolívarian regime.

After some years, was restored on June 11, 1827 by Congress after the fall meeting of the Bolívarian regime or for life. The Vice President and Baquijano Manuel Salazar, head of the executive, was sent to fulfill the 16 June of that year. Force until March 18, 1828, being replaced by the liberal Constitution of 1828.

== Presidents ==
- Toribio Rodríguez de Mendoza, president of the Preparatory Meetings (1822).
- Francisco Xavier de Luna Pizarro, first president (September 20, 1822).
- José de Larrea y Loredo (October 21, 1822).
- Juan Antonio de Andueza (November 21, 1822).
- Hipólito Unanue
- Nicholas Araníbar
- Carlos Pedemonte y Talavera
- Justo Figuerola
- Manuel Arias
- Manuel Salazar y Baquíjano
- José de la Mar
- Felipe Antonio Alvarado
- José María Galdiano
- José Gregorio Paredes

== See also ==
- Peruvian War of Independence
- Constitution of Peru
- Miraflores Conferences
- Freedom Expedition of Perú
- Landing in San Martín
- Eduardo Carrasco Toro

== Bibliography ==
- Basadre Grohmann, Jorge (n.d.). Historia de la República del Perú. Lima: Diario La República. ISBN 9972-205-62-2. Octava edición.
- Arístides Herrera Cuntti (2006) [1983]. Apuntes históricos de una gran ciudad. Lima; AHC Ediciones Perú (RUC N° 10078391575). ISBN 978-9972-2908-0-0.
