= Quilca District =

Coordinates: 16°42′45″S 72°25′24″W

Quilca Qillqa
- District
- Interactive map of Quilca
- Country: Peru
- Region: Arequipa
- Province: Camaná
- Founded: January 2, 1857
- Capital: Quilca

Government
  - Mayor: Hernando Alarcón

Area
  - Total: 912.5 km^{2} (352.3 sq mi)
- Elevation: 82 m (269 ft)

Population (2017)
  - Total: 943
  - Density: 1.03/km^{2} (2.68/sq mi)
- Time zone: UTC-5 (PET)
- UBIGEO: 040207

Quilca District is one of eight districts of the province Camaná in Peru.
