= Manuel Salazar y Baquíjano =

2nd Vice President of Peru

Manuel Salazar
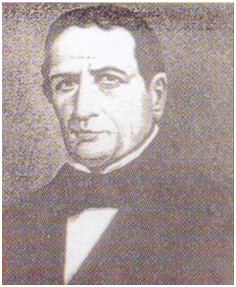

2nd Vice President of Peru
- In office August 22, 1827 – June 7, 1829
- President: José de La Mar
- Preceded by: Vacant (Last held by Diego de Aliaga in 1824)
- Succeeded by: Vacant (Antonio Gutiérrez de la Fuente elected in 1829)

Interim President of Peru
- In office June 9, 1827 – August 22, 1827
- Preceded by: Andrés de Santa Cruz (Head of the Government Junta)
- Succeeded by: José de La Mar (Constitutional President)

Personal details
- Born: July 24, 1777 Lima, Peru
- Died: November 7, 1850 (aged 73) Lima, Peru

Manuel Salazar y Baquíjano, Count of Vistaflorida (July 24, 1777 – November 7, 1850) was a Peruvian politician who briefly served as the Interim President of Peru from June to August 1827, while the elected President José de la Mar arrived to Lima.

Salazar served as the President of the Congress in 1823. He served as the Vice President of Peru from August 1827 to June 1829. He served as the President of the Senate from 1845 to 1849. His parents were José Antonio de Salazar y Breña and Francisca Baquíjano y Carrillo de Córdoba. José Baquíjano was Manuel Salazar's uncle.

Political offices
Preceded by Andrés de Santa Cruz	Interim President of Peru; 1827	Succeeded by José de La Mar
