= Jerónimo Valdés =

Spanish military officer and administrator

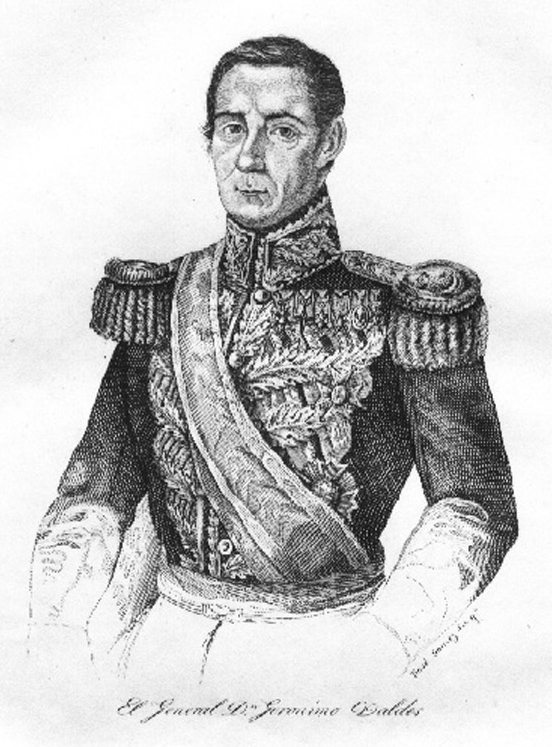
Jerónimo Valdés

Jerónimo Valdés (Villarín (Asturias), 4 May 1784 – Oviedo, 14 November 1855) was a Spanish military officer and administrator.

== Biography ==
Born in Asturias, he participated in the Peninsular War and ended the War as Lieutenant colonel.

He traveled to South America with José de la Serna e Hinojosa in 1816 to suppress the independist rebellion. He was one of the main instigators, along with José de Canterac, of the Aznapuquio mutiny (28 January 1821), which forced the deposition of the Viceroy of Peru, Joaquín de la Pezuela, appointing de La Serna in his place. Valdés became Mariscal de Campo, and distinguished himself in the Battles of Torata and Corpahuaico. After the Ayacucho disaster (1824), he returned to Spain via France in 1824.

He served as Viceroy of Navarre from 1833 to 1834 and also served as Minister of War. He fought on the Liberal (Isabeline) side in the First Carlist War. Valdés lost the Battle of Artaza (22 April 1835).

Valdés signed the Lord Eliot Convention soon after, regulating the treatment of prisoners during the Carlist War.

He later served as captain-general of Valencia (1834–35), Galicia (1838-39), and of Catalonia (1839–40), and served as governor of Cuba from 1841 to September 1843.

Government offices
Preceded by Pedro Sarsfield	Viceroy of Navarre; Jan.–March 1834	Succeeded by Vicente Genaro de Quesada
Preceded by Francisco Dionisio Vives	Captain General of Valencia; 1834–1835	Succeeded by José Carratalá
Preceded by Manuel Llauder	Minister of War; Feb.–June 1835	Succeeded by Pedro Agustín Girón
Preceded by Ramón de Meer y Kindelány	Captain General of Catalonia; 1839–1840	Succeeded by Juan Van Halen
Preceded by Pedro de Alcántara Téllez Girón	Colonial Governor of Cuba; 1841–1843	Succeeded by Leopoldo O'Donnell
