= José de Canterac =

Spanish general

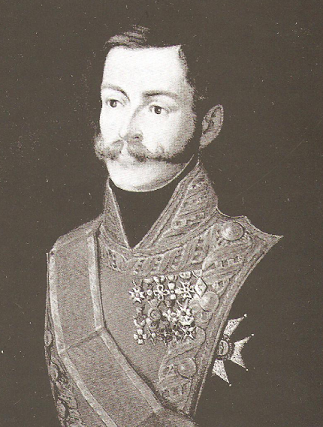
Portrait of José de Canterac

César José de Canterac Orlic y Donesan (July 29, 1786, Casteljaloux, Lot-et-Garone, France – January 18, 1835, Madrid, Spain) was a Spanish general of French origin who fought in the Spanish American wars of independence. In 1816 he joined the army of Pablo Morillo, fighting in the expedition against Isla Margarita.

As Field Marshal, he took command of the Spanish Army in South America in 1822 and gained victories at the battles of Ica (1822) and Moquegua (1823). His defeats in 1824 at the Battle of Junín and the Battle of Ayacucho led to his capitulation to the Patriot forces. Upon his return to Spain, Canterac was made Captain General of Madrid. He was killed in an insurrection in 1835 at the Puerta del Sol in Madrid.

== Sources ==
- Miller, John (1828). Memoirs of general Miller, in the service of the republic of Peru. Vol. 2. London: Longman, Rees, Orme, Brown, and Green.
