= Rudecindo Alvarado =

Argentine general (1792–1872)

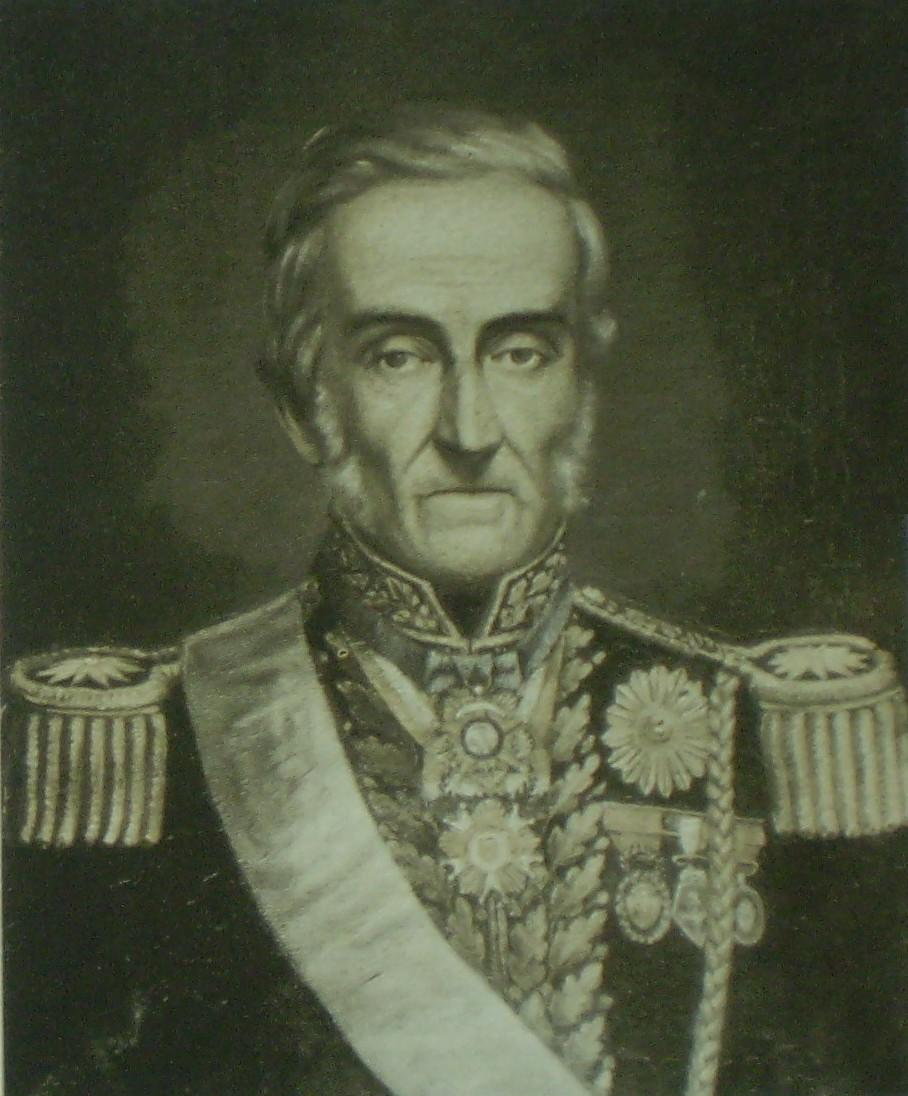
Rudecindo Alvarado

Rudecindo Alvarado (March 1, 1792 – June 22, 1872) was an Argentine general. He fought in the military campaigns of Manuel Belgrano, and in the Army of the Andes. He was governor of Mendoza. He left the country during the rule of Juan Manuel de Rosas, and returned in 1852 after Rosas' defeat at the battle of Caseros.
