= Royal Army of Peru =

Military unit of Peru

- Ejército Real del Perú
- Cross of Burgundy shown on the standards of the royal armies between 1761–1843
- Active: 1804–1826
- Country: Viceroyalty of Peru (Spain)
- Allegiance: The King of Spain
- Role: Land and guerrilla warfare
- Size: In Upper and Lower Peru: 1809: 1,500–5 000; 1813: 8,000; 1818: 11,500; 1820 (August): 23,000; 1822: 20,000; 1823 (February): 18,000–23,000; 1823 (September): 9,000; 1824 (January): 18,000; 1824 (August): 11,000–11,500; 1824 (September): 14,287; 1824 (December): 18,558
- Part of: Spanish Army
- Engagements: Spanish American wars of independence

Commanders
- Notable commanders: Marquess of Concordia (1809–16); Marquess of Viluma (1816–21); Count of the Andes (1821–24)

The Royal Army of Peru (Spanish: Ejército Real del Perú), also known as the National Army (Spanish: Ejército Nacional), was the army organised by the viceroy of Peru, José Fernando de Abascal, to protect the Hispanic Monarchy in the Viceroyalty of Peru—and its surrounding provinces of Charcas, Chile and Quito—of the revolutions that convulsed the Spanish Empire at the beginning of the 19th century. This army was made up of 80% Creoles and indigenous Peruvians.

== See also ==
- Peruvian War of Independence
- United Liberating Army of Peru
