= Lircay =

Lircay may refer to:

== Places ==
- Lircay, Capital city of the Angaraes province of Peru
- Lircay River, a small river near the city of Talca, in the Maule Region of Chile.

== Historical events ==
- Treaty of Lircay (May 14, 1814) - Cease fire treaty signed during the Chilean War of Independence
- Battle of Lircay (April 17, 1830) - Final battle of the Chilean Civil War of 1829
