= Puka Q'asa (Angaraes) =

Mountain in Peru

- Location within Peru

Highest point
- Elevation: 4,600 m (15,100 ft)
- Coordinates: 13°07′27″S 74°46′19″W

Geography
- Location: Peru, Huancavelica Region, Angaraes Province
- Parent range: Andes

Puka Q'asa (Quechua puka red, q'asa mountain pass, "red mountain pass", Hispanicized spelling Pucaccasa) is a mountain in the Andes of Peru, about 4,600 metres (15,092 ft) high. It is situated in the Huancavelica Region, Angaraes Province, Lircay District. Puka Q'asa lies southwest of Hatun Rit'i and Wayra Q'asa, and northwest of Qiwllaqucha.
