= José de la Serna, 1st Count of the Andes =

Spanish general and viceroy (1770–1832)

The Most Excellent The Count of the Andes
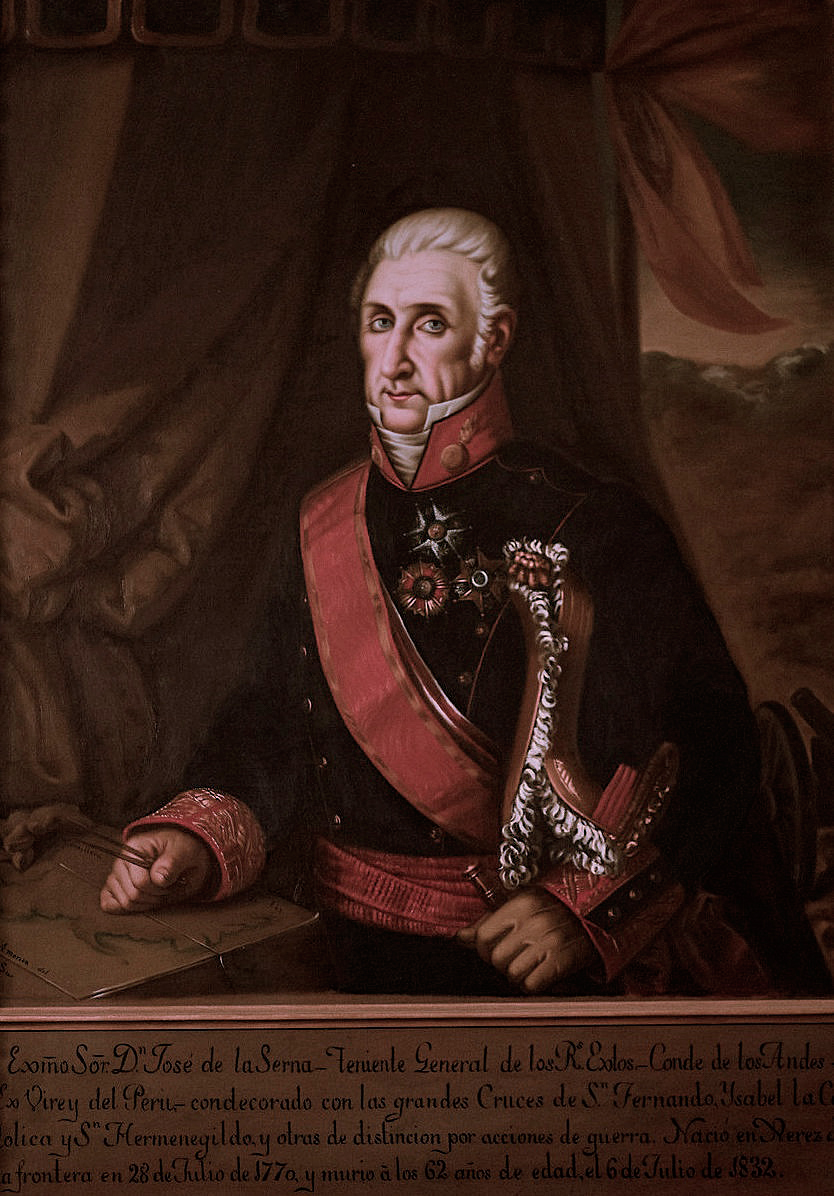

40th Viceroy of Peru
- In office January 29, 1821 – December 9, 1824
- Monarch: Ferdinand VII
- Preceded by: Joaquín de la Pezuela
- Succeeded by: Juan Pío de Tristán

Personal details
- Born: July 28, 1770 Jerez de la Frontera, Spain
- Died: July 6, 1832 (aged 62) Cádiz, Spain
- Profession: Lieutenant General
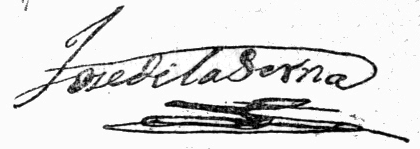
- Signature
- Awards: Order of Saint Hermelegind; Order of Santiago

José de la Serna e Hinojosa, 1st Count of the Andes (July 28, 1770 – July 6, 1832) was a Spanish general and colonial official. He was the last Spanish viceroy of Peru to exercise effective power (January 29, 1821 to December 1824).

== Background ==
He was born in Jerez de la Frontera on 28 July 1770. His family had been dedicated to military careers for many generations. He was the 7th of the nine children of Álvaro de la Serna and Figueroa (Jerez de la Frontera, July 12, 1723 - March 6, 1791), Knight of the Order of Santiago, who dedicated himself to a military career and was a Caballero Veintiquatro (akin to councilor) of Jerez and Master of the Real Maestranza de Caballería de Ronda; and of Nicolasa Martínez de Hinojosa y López Trujillo (or Truxillo) (Jerez de la Frontera, September 1, 1739 - October 10, 1823). These names go back to the reconquest of Jerez.

On 29 December 1780 (at 10 years old), José de la Serna was appointed alcalde for the caballeros hidalgos. On 8 September 1781, he was accepted as a knight cadet by the Military College of Artillery of Segovia; his admission took place on September 20, 1782. In 1789 he graduated as second lieutenant or ensign.

He saw his first service (as a cadet) in the defense of Ceuta against the Moors in 1784, distinguishing himself in outings that destroyed the batteries of the besieger, forcing him to lift the siege. Later he saw service against the French in Catalonia and Roussillon until the signing of the Peace of Basel (1795). He was promoted to lieutenant.

The Treaty of San Ildefonso, allying Spain and France against England, brought him to fight alongside the French and under the orders of Admiral José de Mazarredo (1797), with the ship Bahamas from 1799 to 1802. In 1801 he received the rank of captain.

He was then transferred to Andalusia, entrusted with the inspection of Inválidos Hábiles, (Note: The Inválidos Hábiles were a military unit composed of soldiers who had lost one or more members in the course of campaigns. According to Berrocal Díaz, this unit represents the real background of the current National Police.) and gained the rank of sargento mayor or commandant in 1805.

He fought under Wellington during the campaign of the fourth coalition (1806–1807) in the Spanish War of Independence against the French.

== The Peninsular War, 1807-1814 ==
In 1808 La Serna joined as lieutenant colonel the improvised army organized by the local government of Valencia; he was involved in the defence of Valencia (June 1808) and in the battle of the Júcar river against Marshal Jeannot de Moncey.

His unit then went to assist besieged Zaragoza (15 June to 14 August 180), entering Paniza on 7 August 1808 with 6,000 men, 100 horses and 6 pieces of artillery, and reinforcing the threat on Lefebvre-Desnouettes's back which eventually forced the latter to abandon the siege. On 15 August, he officially received the rank of lieutenant colonel. He followed the actions of Castaños encased in his artillery and was present at the battle of Tudela (23 November 1808), a Spanish defeat that forced the army to retreat to Zaragoza.

During Zaragoza's second siege (20 December 1808 – 20 February 1809), the batteries located between Santa Engracia and the Convento de la Trinidad were under his command, and then those from the Puente de Piedra to the Puerta del Sol. In 1808, in the midst of the siege, he was appointed colonel and in 1809 promoted to brigadier. The siege of Zaragoza was the war action he was most proud of and, throughout his life, always wore the medal of his defenders as his favorite distinction. The capitulation of 20 February 1809 made him a captive; he was taken to the Nancy depot, from which he escaped in the autumn of 1812 with another officer. Both arrived together in Genoa, but lacking support and no ship to board, they crossed the Alps again and, crossing Bavaria in the middle of winter, Austria, Hungary, Bulgaria and Macedonia, arrived in Thessaloniki after six months of walking and seven hundred and fifty leagues. Finally he was able to sail for Spain and arrived in Mahón on 28 March 1813.

In 1814 Ferdinand VII created the Order of Saint Hermelegild (Orden de San Hermenegildo) to recognize his supporters during his years of captivity and La Serna was awarded this distinction.

== In command of Spanish forces in Upper Peru ==
Reincorporated into service, he was appointed field marshal, and on 1 May 1816 he was named general in chief of the Army of Alto Peru to replace General Joaquín de la Pezuela who had been promoted to viceroy of Peru. He embarked in Cadiz on the frigate Venganza, with some officers and troops to strengthen the army he was going to command. He arrived in Arica on 7 September, and reached his destination as per his orders. This displeased viceroy Joaquín de la Pezuela, who had wanted to meet La Serna before the latter reached his assignment. Thus their relation started on the wrong foot, impairing La Serna's command of the Army of Upper Peru: his orders included that of reorganizing those troops and creating a General Staff, and Pezuela was against both measures. (Note: Sobrevilla (2011) makes some good points in the defence of Pezuela's attitude: In 1816, La Serna replaced Joaquín de la Pezuela as head of the army in Upper Peru. In spite of his predecessor's success defeating the troops sent by the Junta of Buenos Aires to the highland areas of present-day Bolivia, La Serna refused to follow his orders. Based on his experience, Pezuela was adamant that La Serna should try to prevent the Porteños from crossing the Andes to Chile. Having fought first in Africa and later in the Peninsular Wars, José de San Martín was also able to apply his knowledge of war across the Atlantic to a new context. When La Serna attempted to contain him, San Martín had already crossed through Mendoza to support the Chileans, who under Bernardo O'Higgins had been fighting the royalists since 1811. The newly arrived officers did not only bring their experience of war, they also brought their readiness to exercise what they considered their rights and make their opinions known, even if this meant disrespecting hierarchy. They believed they were the ones who knew how to win the war. Once in the Andes, these men who had fought in the name of the Cádiz Constitution and are often regarded as liberals, had to learn how war differed in the American context. Pezuela could see this, having experienced his own adaptation to a different environment some years previously. He explained how La Serna had asked to be transferred outside of the Andes because he felt ill-prepared for the post "tried to sort out the army with the kind of discipline found in Europe, but which is impossible to reproduce in a locality, with characters and inhabitants with such different opinions...") Moreover, the viceroy considered that La Serna should be subject to him because he himself represented the highest authority; and the general in chief was of the opinion that, as a general, he was independent in what pertained to his army — a view reinforced by that the territories subject to the Army of Upper Peru were not part of that viceroyalty but of Buenos Aires.

The viceroy imposed on La Serna to advance on Jujuy and Salta. La Serna expressly disagreed multiple times, not least because he did not have the necessary reserve body to guarantee communications. He and his troops reached Salta but had to withdraw in a painful retreat back to their starting bases. In 1817, La Serna reorganized his army and expanded it from a defensive force to develop its attack capability. This measure cost money, taken from taxes, and that became another point of contention with the viceroy. The confrontation developed to the point that he formally presented his resignation to the king.

At that time, and in view of the successive announcements of a major expedition to Buenos Aires from the Peninsula, Captain General José de San Martín decided to invade Chile with his Army of the Andes, by crossing the Andes via the most direct route. The 21-day crossing of the mountains from Argentina was arduous, but the Battle of Chacabuco was a resounding success for San Martín who defeated the troops sent to stop him — greatly helped in that by the contradictory orders and doubts of Royal Governor Field Marshal Marcó. Very few of the royal troops were able to finally embark in Valparaíso.

Pezuela decided to recover Chile and ordered La Serna to form a reserve force to support the action he planned. This led to yet another disagreement between him and La Serna, with the latter again presenting his resignation from his post in the army of Upper Peru. In December 1817 the expedition for the reconquest of Chile left under the command of General Osorio (Pezuela's son-in-law), and arrived at Talcahuano in February 1818. On March 19, the royalist army attacked O'Higgins at Cancharayada and achieved victory in that battle, seizing all the enemy artillery. However, Osorio missed taking advantage of it; and when he reached the plains of Maipú on April 5, his troops were subjected to a heavy defeat by San Martín's troops. Meanwhile, the formation of the reserve corps continued to widen the gap between La Serna and Pezuela, although it was eventually organized according to the viceroy's wishes. Throughout 1818, the Army of Upper Peru carried out important actions against insurgent parties; willing or not, the territory under its command was "pacified". Furthering the clash of personalities, La Serna thought that war should be offensive and Pezuela thought it should be defensive. Also, Pezuela was considered an absolutist and La Serna, having fought in the name of the Cádiz Constitution, was seen as a liberal. But Víctor Peralta contests these views, citing among other examples that La Serna supposedly reinstituted the freedom of the press but no one had the right to publish anything in favour of Pezuela; another example is that La Serna tried to limit as much as possible the election of municipal councils, whereas Pezuela had publicly called for these elections.

La Serna formally resigned again on 23 November 1818, citing ill health. Pezuela remained lenient regarding this unauthorized move, which he did not punish; and La Serna returned to wait for his official leave. While waiting for this resignation's formal acceptance, in the spring of 1819 La Serna repeated with complete success the previous unfortunate expedition to Jujuy, giving a severe punishment to the gauchos who harassed his army and taking thousands of cattle.

He obtained his official leave on 31 September and left for Lima, where he arrived on 29 November. Pezuela was suspicious of the chiefs he had under his orders; (Note: Pezuela wrote in his diary: "...in order to fill with his [La Serna's] superior rank already, the useless generals here I have at my command.") and he was also preoccupied by the evolution of the situation in Santa Fé (now called Bogotá). (Note: the Junta de Santa Fe was established on 20 July 1810, in what is often called the Colombian Declaration of Independence. Then came 1810-1816, period of la Patria Boba: intense conflicts between federalist and centralist factions over the nature of the new government of the recently emancipated juntas. The Province of Santa Fé became the Free and Independent State of Cundinamarca, soon embroiled in a civil war against other local juntas which banded together to form the United Provinces of New Granada and advocated for a federalist government system. Following a failed military campaign against Quito, General Simón Bolívar of the United Provinces led a campaign that led to the surrender of the Cundinamarca province in December 1814. In 1819, Bolívar initiated his campaign to liberate New Granada. Following a series of battles, the last of which was the Battle of Boyacá, the republican army led by Bolívar cleared its way to Santa Fé, where he arrived victorious on 10 August 1819. It was Simón Bolívar who rebaptized the city with the name of Bogotá, to honor the Muisca people and to emphasize the emancipation from Spain. Bogotá then became the capital of the Gran Colombia.) So he asked La Serna not to embark for Spain but to remain in Lima as his second-in-command, thus becoming lieutenant general.

During 1819, Lima – from the point of view of the Spanish – balanced between the hopes of the announced Spanish expedition against Buenos Aires and the dread of a Chilean invasion of its coasts. The Riego coup d'état on 1 January 1820, however, not only changed the political regime in Spain, but also meant the abandonment of the great expedition of 18,000 men which could have restored the king's authority in South America. This freed San Martín from the worry of an expeditionary army, and in September 1819 he landed at Pisco with 4,300 men, only 300 km from Lima.

This came only four months after the Spanish government ordered Pezuela, on 11 April 1819, to enter into negotiations with the patriots. The Royal Order asked the insurgents to swear by the newly implemented Cádiz Constitution of 1812; if they did not accept that, commissioners were to be sent to Madrid and in the meantime hostilities should be suspended. La Serna thought that the insurgents would not be willing to swear allegiance to the constitution; so he proposed that cash be offered, as well as the control of Tacna and Arica. His real aim was to have the commissioners travel to and from Spain and to lengthen negotiations so as to gain enough time to strengthen the army.

Meanwhile, Lima was in chaos. The city had endured a year-long blockade but became isolated by sea after November 1820 when Cochrane attacked and took the frigate Esmeralda; and it was also surrounded by land with guerrilla forces that had come from the Andes. Pezuela insisted that Lima should be preserved at all costs, and that its loss would sign the defeat of the whole loyalist cause. La Serna, again, clashed with Pezuela and saw Lima as expendable – for practical reasons: it was undefendable without a functioning navy, and it was very difficult to provision. In his experience, difficult positions should be left to the enemy.

== The coup against Pezuela ==
In January 1821, a month after the Northern provinces declared their independence, the situation in Lima reached its boiling point. On January 29, 1821, a group of officers petitioned viceroy Pezuela to resign and nominate La Serna to take over his post. Jerónimo Valdés and José de Canterac were key figures in getting these officers to rally for the coup. All the members of the military Ejército Real signed a declaration accusing the viceroy of inaction, of having made many tactical mistakes and of failing to defend the city against San Martín. This letter quickly reached the Spanish Court and on 29 July and 13 August 1821 the new viceroy was confirmed in all political and military positions.

Originally, La Serna refused the command and requested his passport for Spain. Pezuela replied that if he himself made the sacrifice of leaving, La Serna had to make an equivalent sacrifice and accept the charge. Eventually, Pezuela relinquished his authority as viceroy to La Serna, who took office the next morning 30 January.

Implications

This event had far-reaching and socially-noteworthy consequences. Viceroys being deposed were no novelty: it had already happened in Mexico, Río de la Plata and New Granada – but only in the context of forming juntas. This mutiny, known in Spanish as the “pronunciamiento de Aznapuquio”, was not so much rooted into previous American experiences, but came most of all from the Riego coup d'état in Spain. Its main trait is that it marks the time when the military as a corporation began intervening in politics.

== As viceroy of Peru ==
La Serna was sworn in as interim viceroy. He gave up 60 per cent of his salary to alleviate the economic situation of the viceroyalty; following this, all the army chiefs and ministers of the Audiencia agreed to retain half their assets and to reintegrate them when conditions were favourable.

The change of politics in Spain also meant that the awaited reinforcement of 20,000 men promised to the royalists in South America never arrived. Instead, the Spanish Parliament sent another delegate bearing its orders to the new viceroy: the captain of frigate Manuel Abreu. However, before meeting the viceroy in April 1821, Abreu met with San Martín — a move that greatly displeased the loyalists in Lima.

The instructions that Manuel Abreu brought were quite similar to those given to Pezuela: essentially that hostilities should be suspended; and that the Constitution should be sworn in and deputies from the independantists sent to the Spanish Parliament. (Note: The Spanish government proposed that if an agreement was achieved on the suspension of hostilities and the allegiance to the constitution, all the past would be forgiven and forgotten. It ruled that decisions should be taken by majority in the board appointed and in the event of a tie, the viceroy's opinion should prevail. Foreign mediation was expressly prohibited. And any agreement would be provisional until approved by the Spanish Parliament. Those backing the "nación española" made generous offers to those fighting for independence, if they would accept the constitution – including salaries and other benefits. San Martín's propositions were no less reasonable: declare independence of Peru; unify both armies; appoint a government presided by La Serna with two vocals named one for each side; and San Martín offered to travel to Spain to ask for an infant to rule as King the American countries.)

Negotiations did begin on May 3, 1821: deputies from both parties (Note: Present at the negotiation table were, on the side of the viceroy: Field Marshal Manuel de Llano Nájera, the mayor José María Galdeano y Mendoza, Manuel Abreu and as secretary Captain Francisco Moar; on the side of San Martín there were Colonel Tomás Guido, Juan García del Río, José Ignacio de la Roza and as secretary Fernando López Aldana.) met in Punchauca, thirty kilometers from Lima. During these talks they agreed to an armistice and a meeting between San Martín and the viceroy. San Martín and La Serna met in person on June 2. (Note: There is a curious parallel in both San Martín and La Serna service sheet. Both entered the army at the age of twelve and their first destination was Africa between 1790 and 1791, one in Ceuta and another in Oran. From there they were transferred to the Roussillon in the War of the Convention under the orders of General Ricardos, both reaching the rank of lieutenant in 1794 for their merits in campaign. The Treaty of San Ildefonso had the two officers serving under the command of Admiral Mazarredo in the war against England. With a year's difference in favor of La Serna, they were promoted to captain, and the Peace of Amiens sends both to serve in southern Spain. In 1808, they joined the uprising of the country against the French: San Martín in Andalusia and La Serna in Valencia, where they were posted, and both were promoted to the rank of lieutenant colonel for their military actions that year. They attended, each with its unit, to the same action of war, the battle and defeat of Tudela, after which, the army of Andalusia retreated towards the south and that of Palafox was closed in Zaragoza. The next meeting took place near Lima, in South America, with both generals in charge of rival armies and having in their hands the future of a continent.) The negotiations lasted until June 24. Those backing the "nación española" were not, however, able to accept the only condition that the other side really wanted: official recognition of independence. The insurgents demanded it, and Spain insisted on submission to the king. In a private letter San Martín acknowledged he had never really thought of accepting peace and had just wanted to gain time.

La Serna took the strategic measure that he had already proposed six months earlier: he evacuated Lima, without resources because of the blockade of the Chilean fleet, and withdrew inland. The operation was carried out by two corps of army commanded respectively by Canterac and La Serna, leaving a strong garrison at Callao. Established in the valley of Jauja, La Serna reorganized and rebuilt the army, providing it with the necessary equipment thanks to the fertile and populated valleys of the interior.

When La Serna was in position to assist Callao – besieged by land since 12 July 1821 –, he sent Canterac on August 24 with 4,000 men – less than that of San Martín, who however did not dare to interpose himself. When this expedition returned to the mountains, La Mar (Note: Before the dismissal of Pezuela as viceroy, La Mar did not agree to the appointment of José de La Serna, so he did not sign the representation made by the leaders of the royalist army encamped in Aznapuquio; but he did submit to his demands and requests as chief of the royalist army in Peru. Despite the numerical disadvantage of his troops in Callao, La Mar did his best to not surrender even though on more than one occasion San Martín asked for his unconditional surrender. Aware of La Mar's difficult situation, José de Canterac, at that time stationed at Jauja, left on the order of La Serna to help of La Mar. However, Canterac was misinformed: he believed that San Martín's troops were small and that the city of Lima was in favor of the royalist cause. Canterac reached Callao without entering the capital of the viceroyalty and camped with his troops, adjacent to the walls of the fortress of Real Felipe. The orders of La Serna had been clear: if La Mar had no chance to defeat the independentistas, he should destroy the fortress and save the garrison, leading it towards the sierra. As soon as Canterac returned to the mountains, San Martín charged anew against the Real Felipe fortress, at last forcing La Mar to give up his arduous task of defending the place. Without food, nor rations for his troops, La Mar arranged the capitulation with San Martín, who allowed the royalist soldiers a dignified and fair exit. They were even allowed to regroup with the battalions stationed in the mountains or leave Peru within a maximum of four months. All Spanish properties and ships were respected and complete amnesty was given to those men who passed into the patriotic ranks. La Mar was surprised by such generosity, officially thanked San Martín and resigned his military position through a letter to the viceroy La Serna. In October 1821, San Martín himself summoned La Mar and proposed for him to join the independence army as a major general; La Mar was even recognized as a grand marshal (in March 1822), despite having not participated in any battle.) surrendered the fortresseson September 19, 1821, due to lack of supplies.

La Serna established the capital in Cuzco; he brought with him the first printing press in Cuzco, on which was published the famous newspaper El Depositario. He strengthened its position so that it changed the course of the war, despite not receiving any help from Spain. Canterac defeated a powerful insurgent army commanded by Domingo Tristán at Ica on 20 April 1822. This victory provided the viceroy with the necessary rifles, which was the only thing he could not build in his domains.

1822-1823 was the time of the "First Intermedios campaign, when the royalists managed to block the path to the United Liberating Army and triumphed in two consecutive battles: Torata and Moquegua (January 19 and 21, 1823) The second Intermedios campaign was just as successful for the royalists in spite of the indecisive set-back of the battle of Zepita. The forts of El Callao were recovered in February 1824. By 1824, La Serna had recovered all of Peru except the area of Trujillo, where Bolivar had taken refuge and which Canterac was preparing to reconquer.

=== Olañeta's rebellion ===
But in Cuzco, dissension broke out in the royalist army. In the period 1821–1824, Olañeta was in charge of Upper Peru while the veteran soldiers from the Peninsular Wars were directed on the rest of Peru. From February 1824 onward, Olañeta stopped recognizing La Serna as the legitimate representative of the king; he was of the opinion that La Serna, as a constitutionalist, was unfit to represent the absolute king. He refused to obey, and maintained an independent royalist force in Upper Peru. (Note: Born in 1770, Olañeta was originally from Elgueta, a small village in Guipúzcoa province, in the Bay of Biscay (and not Biscayne as says Sobrevilla Perea). The main point here is that Olañeta knew very well the Salta region, where he had lived since he was 17 years old; and had been a prominent trader on the Potosí-Salta-Jujuy route. He had also had a stint in the local militias – he was nicknamed 'the contrabandist' because of this – and he had been fighting in the area since 1809. He lacked formal military training but his experience largely made up for that gap. He first became disgruntled because José de Canterac had been put in charge of the division covering the north of the area (Gerónimo Valdés had the command of the southern division); moreover, in 1819 La Serna created the charge of sub-inspector of troops especially for Canterac - despite the fact that the latter was a notably younger man who tended to privilege the men who had recently arrived from Spain, above those who had served longer. Furthermore, Canterac was notably arrogant. Olañeta also resented that when La Serna travelled to Lima, Canterac was put in charge of the troops in the rearguard near Tupiza. During the period 1821-1824, Olañeta's resentment grew to include most decisions made by La Serna. In February 1824, he made a declaration that he called Viva la Religion, whereby he accused La Serna and Valdés – in Sobrevilla Perea's words – “of profanating sacred objects, of hating the King and of destroying order”.) Valdés abolished the constitutional regime in Upper Peru on 29 February 1824 to try to placate him - followed in this by La Serna in Cuzco on 11 March. Olañeta seemed to accept peace, but as soon as Valdés left, he went back to criticizing La Serna and published another declaration in that sense in June.

He rose up in arms claiming that Ferdinand VII had regained his whole power; that this news had come through Buenos Aires and he, by his proximity at the border with that country, was the first to receive it. La Serna waited for instructions from Spain, as spreading false news to sow confusion was a classic 'intoxication' manoeuver. However, the situation was delicate: Olañeta held a territory on the fringe of the land held by the royalists; sending troops against him meant withdrawing troops from elsewhere, long distances away, and in particular it meant withdrawing troops from the front against Bolivar who was waiting for reinforcements from Colombia. In the end, La Serna had to send Valdes with the whole army of the south and part of the troops of Canterac to reduce the rebel. The battle of Lava (in the present Linares Province, Potosí Department; 17 August 1824) resolved the conflict but left Valdés' army very diminished: he had to withdraw garrisons from the cities to rebuild it in part and, after a march of one thousand eight hundred kilometers, meet with the viceroy. Meanwhile, Bolivar had used the opportunity and left his camp to attack the royalists.

General William Miller, a British-born military who came to South America in 1819 to join the Liberation army, also believed that the loyalists had let the United Liberating Army advance in 1824 only because Olañeta's rebellion had so markedly weakened them. Indeed, at the end of September 1824, while in Oruro, Olañeta received a message from Bolivar who praised him for his actions against the viceroy, saying that it certainly had made his work easier by weakening not only the royalist army, but also Olañeta's own forces who had thus been reduced to about 4,000 men.

== Return to Spain ==
On his way back to Spain, he passed through Rio de Janeiro. There, he learned that the king had congratulated him for his dedication, that he had been officially appointed viceroy of Peru, and that he had been awarded the Cross of San Fernando, as well as the title of Count of the Andes.

Back in Spain, La Serna was welcomed at court. He remained for a few years in Jerez de la Frontera. On January 27, 1831, he was appointed captain general of Granada and president of the Royal Chancellery of Granada. In his new command he had to face the invasion of Manzanares, who had landed in Malaga as well as Torrijos. Then he undertook an active fight against the banditry that was ravaging Andalusia, and managed to bring the Los Botijas to justice. (Note: The "group of Los Botijas" (la partida de Los Botijas) were a group of bandits around the town of Jaén and more specifically around Torredelcampo.)

He died childless in the military hospital of Cádiz on 6 July 1832. His will showed that the public administration owed him 174,000 pesos, as unpaid wages from his service in Peru.

== Sources ==
- Arteaga, Íñigo Moreno y de (2010). "José de la Serna y Martínez de Hinojosa". hispanica.rah.es (in Spanish). Real Academia de la Historia.
- Miller, John (1828). Memoirs of general Miller, in the service of the republic of Peru. Vol. 2. London: Longman, Rees, Orme, Brown, and Green.
- Sobrevilla Perea, Natalia (2011). "From Europe to the Andes and back: Becoming 'Los Ayacuchos'" (PDF). European History Quarterly. 41 (3): 472–488 (see p. 475).

== See also ==
- Peruvian War of Independence
- Spanish American wars of independence
- Patriot governments
- Batallón Voltígeros de la Guardia (Voltigeurs of the Guard Battalion, formerly Numancia Battalion,
- Rebellion of Olañeta (5 February 1824 – )
- Callao uprising (5 February 1824)
- Battle of Junín (6 August 1824)
- Battle of Ayacucho (9 December 1824)
  - Battle of Ayacucho order of battle
- Ayacuchos

Government offices
Preceded by Joaquín de la Pezuela	Viceroy of Peru; 1821–1824	Succeeded by Juan Pío de Tristán
