= Altos de Lircay National Reserve =

National reserve in Chile

- IUCN category IV (habitat/species management area)
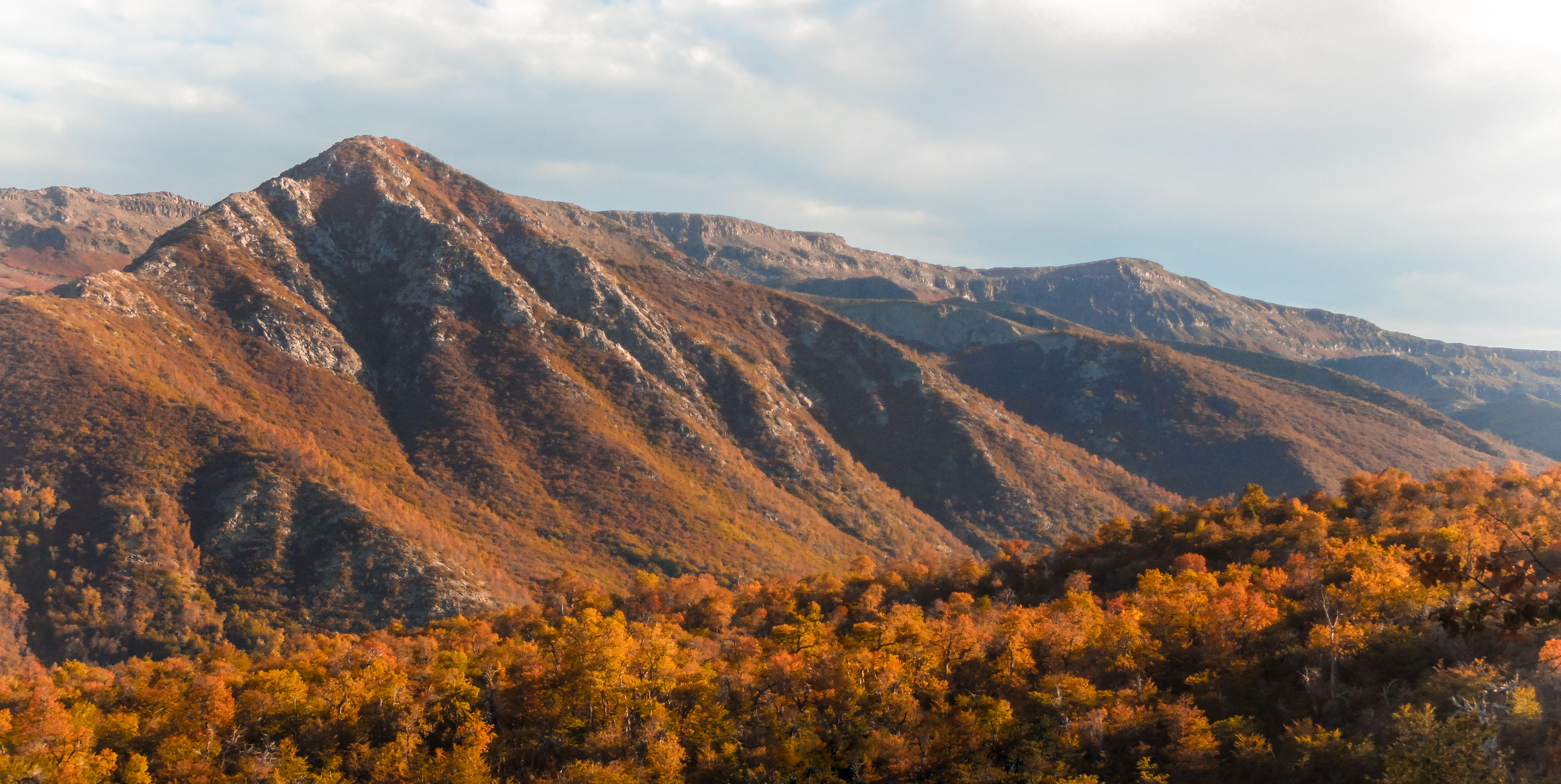
- Panoramic

- Location within Chile
- Location: Talca Province, Maule Region, Chile
- Nearest city: San Clemente
- Coordinates: 35°35′24″S 70°56′13″W
- Area: 121.63 km^{2} (46.96 mi^{2})
- Established: 1996
- Governing body: Corporación Nacional Forestal

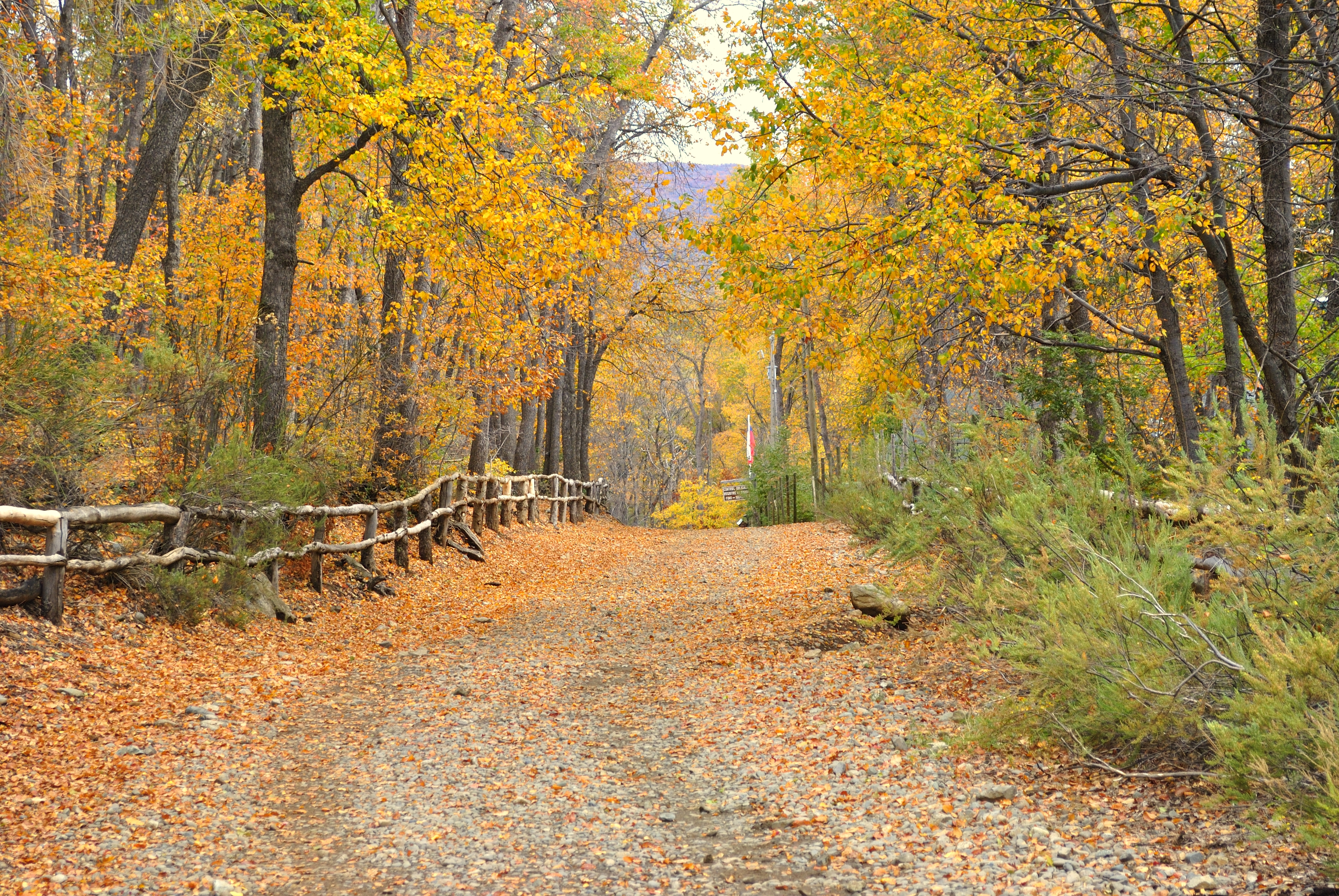
Access road to Altos de Lircay.

Altos de Lircay National Reserve is a 121.63 km^{2} (46.96 mi^{2}) nature reserve located in Talca Province, Maule Region, Chile. It lies in a pre-Andean area close to Radal Siete Tazas National Park, as well as the Descabezado Grande and Cerro Azul volcanoes.

The reserve is home to a significant variety of wildlife, including rare and threatened animals such as the Tricahue parrot, Molina's hog-nosed skunk and plants such as the ciprés de la cordillera and roble Maulino. In the area, seven of the ten species of the genus Nothofagus occurring in Chile can be found.

There are three major rivers in the reserve, the Lircay, which is a tributary of the Claro River, the Claro that flows north to south through the reserve, and the Blanquillo, which joins the latter river in the reserve.
