= Baháʼí Faith in Peru =

The Baháʼí Faith in Peru begins with references to Peru in Baháʼí literature as early as 1916, with the first Baháʼís visiting as early as 1919. A functioning community wasn't founded in Peru until the 1930s with the beginning of the arrival of coordinated pioneers from the United States which progressed into finding national Peruvian converts and achieved an independent national community in 1961. The Association of Religion Data Archives (relying mostly on the World Christian Encyclopedia) estimated some 41,300 Baháʼís in 2010.

== ʻAbdu'l-Bahá's Tablets of the Divine Plan ==
ʻAbdu'l-Bahá, the son of the founder of the religion, wrote a series of letters, or tablets, to the followers of the religion in the United States in 1916–1917; these letters were compiled together in the book titled Tablets of the Divine Plan. The sixth of the tablets was the first to mention Latin American regions and was written on 8 April 1916, but was delayed in being presented in the United States until 1919 – after the end of World War I and the Spanish flu. ʻAbdu'l-Bahá's sixth tablet was translated and presented by Mirza Ahmad Sohrabon 4 April 1919, and published in Star of the West magazine on 12 December 1919.

"His Holiness Christ says: Travel ye to the East and to the West of the world and summon the people to the Kingdom of God. Hence the mercy of God must encompass all humanity. Therefore do ye not think it permissible to leave that region deprived of the breezes of the Morn of Guidance. Consequently, strive as far as ye are able to send to those parts fluent speakers, who are detached from aught else save God, attracted with the fragrances of God, and sanctified and purified from all desires and temptations. ...Guatemala, Honduras, Salvador, Nicaragua, Costa Rica, Panama and the seventh country Belize...The teachers going to those parts must also be familiar with the Spanish language. Attach great importance to the indigenous population of America...Likewise the islands of ... Cuba, Haiti, Puerto Rico, Jamaica, ... Bahama Islands, even the small Watling Island...Haiti and Santo Domingo...the islands of Bermuda... the republics of the continent of South America – Colombia, Ecuador, Peru, Brazil, the Guianas, Bolivia, Chile, Argentina, Uruguay, Paraguay, Venezuela; also the islands to the north, east and west of South America, such as Falkland Islands, the Galapagòs, Juan Fernandez, Tobago and Trinidad...."

The first actions on the part of Baháʼí community towards Latin America were that of a few individuals who made trips to Mexico and South America near or before this unavailing in 1919. Foremost was Martha Root. Root's travels included Peru which was reported in October 1920 in an edition of the Star of the West, including making contact with several people through a Dr. Vargas.

== Seven Year Plan and succeeding decades ==
Among the earliest Baháʼís known in Peru were Louis Mathew (1935) and Isabel Stebbins Dodge (1935–38).Shoghi Effendi, who was named ʻAbdu'l-Bahá's successor, wrote a cable on 1 May 1936 to the Baháʼí Annual Convention of the United States and Canada, and asked for the systematic implementation of ʻAbdu'l-Bahá's vision to begin. In his cable he wrote:

"Appeal to assembled delegates ponder historic appeal voiced by ʻAbdu'l-Bahá in Tablets of the Divine Plan. Urge earnest deliberation with incoming National Assembly to insure its complete fulfillment. First century of Baháʼí Era drawing to a close. Humanity entering outer fringes most perilous stage its existence. Opportunities of present hour unimaginably precious. Would to God every State within American Republic and every Republic in American continent might ere termination of this glorious century embrace the light of the Faith of Baháʼu'lláh and establish structural basis of His World Order."

Following the 1 May cable, another cable from Shoghi Effendi came on 19 May calling for permanent pioneers to be established in all the countries of Latin America. The Baháʼí National Spiritual Assembly of the United States and Canada appointed the Inter-America Committee to take charge of the preparations. During the 1937 Baháʼí North American Convention, Shoghi Effendi cabled advising the convention to prolong their deliberations to permit the delegates and the National Assembly to consult on a plan that would enable Baháʼís to go to Latin America as well as to include the completion of the outer structure of the Baháʼí House of Worship in Wilmette, Illinois. Following this call Stuart and Nellie S. French (1936) went through Peru. In 1937 the First Seven Year Plan (1937–44), which was an international plan designed by Shoghi Effendi, gave the American Baháʼís the goal of establishing the Baháʼí Faith in every country in Latin America. With the spread of American Baháʼís in Latin American, Baháʼí communities and Local Spiritual Assemblies began to form in 1938 across Latin America. Isabel Stebbins Dodge was joined by her mother, Mrs. Joel Stebbins, the summer of 1937.

The first pioneer under the next plan was Eve Nicklin, called the "Spiritual Mother of Peru" who arrived in Peru in 1941. In 1942–3 she was able to coordinate a number of talks by traveling Baháʼí Philip Sprague amounting to several hundred people.

In 1943 during the annual Baháʼí convention of the United States, Shoghi Effendi announced a Northern- and Southern-international convention which would include representatives from each state and province from the United States and Canada and each republic of Latin America. During this convention, Isabel Tirada de Barrada and Raymond Betts were the Peruvian delegates.

The first South American Baháʼí Congress was held in Buenos Aires, Argentina, November 1946. In 1947 the Baháʼí international teaching committee for South America (CEPSA) was appointed and the first members were all from Chile. Retrospectively a stated goal of the committee was to facilitate a shift in the balance of roles from North American guidance and Latin cooperation to Latin guidance and North American cooperation. The process was well underway by 1950 and was to be enforced about 1953.

=== Transition to Latin leadership ===
The second South American Baháʼí Congress was celebrated in Santiago, Chile, in January 1948 and was organized and executed by CEPSA. The Peruvian official delegate was Mercedes Sanchez. In 1950, the Baháʼí Faith achieved legal recognition in Chile with the formation of an international Regional Spiritual Assembly for South America whose first members were Edmund Miessler of Brazil, Margot Worley of Brazil, Eve Nicklin of Peru, Gayle Woolson of Colombia, Esteban Canales of Paraguay, Mercedes Sanchez of Peru, Dr. Alexander Reid of Chile, Rangvald Taetz of Uruguay, and Manuel Vera of Peru.

In 1957 this Assembly was split into two – basically northern/eastern South America with the Republics of Brazil, Peru, Colombia, Ecuador, and Venezuela, in Lima, Peru and one of the western/southern South America with the Republics of Argentina, Chile, Uruguay, Paraguay, and Bolivia in Buenos Aires, Argentina. Horace Holley represented the National Spiritual Assembly of the United States at conventions held in Panama and Lima, Peru when Latin American national Baha'i assemblies were elected.

== National community ==
In 1961, La Asamblea Espiritual Nacional de los Bahais del Peru was elected.

By 1963 there were 19 delegates for the convention to elect the National Spiritual Assembly of Peru. For the election of the Universal House of Justice the international head of the religion since its election in 1963, the delegates for the voting were the members of the National Spiritual Assemblies of the world. The Peruvian members of the national assembly were recorded for this first election: Guillermo Aguilar, Fidel Flores, Cesar Loayza, Lester W. Long, Demetrio Molero, Mrs. Jesus Rivera, Josefina Rosas, Mercedes Sanchez, and Dr. Enrique Sanchez. At the same time members of the religion were known to exist among the indigenous near Arequipa, and the Quechua people. Local assemblies were formed in Arequipa, Cajamarca, Callao, Chiclayo, Huancayo, Lima, and two other villages. Groups of Baha'is were in Cuzco, Punto Tongos, and Trujillo and isolated Baha'is in Julcamarca, Talara, and Yurimaguas.

=== Indigenous peoples ===
In 1975 Baháʼís attending an All-Quechua Baháʼí Conference were photographed beside a sign, which, translated from the Spanish, reads: "Baháʼu'lláh is the return of Viracocha.”

In 1975–6 Hand of the Cause Rúhíyyih Khanum travelled by boat through the tributaries of the Amazon River of Brazil and also visiting the high mountain ranges of Peru and Bolivia. Thirty six tribal groups were visited over a period of six months; the trip was called The Green Light Expedition.

The first Aymara International Baha'i Conference was held in Juli, Peru, in August 1978. More than 200 Baha'is from Bolivia, Ecuador and Peru were present. The entire conference was conducted in the Aymara language.

In 1980 two teams of Native American Baha'is from Alaska, Canada and the United States representing 10 tribes under the name Trail of Light traveled from the north to the south starting mid June and taught in Mexico, Belize, Costa Rica, Guatemala, Honduras, Panama, Bolivia, Chile, Peru and finally Ecuador. In 1984 a reprise of the 'Trail of Light' was undertaken when an international team of five Baháʼís spent 17 days in Guatemala; they were a Mapuche Indian from Chile, a Quechua from Peru, a Bribri from Costa Rica, and two Guaymis from Panama as well as other efforts in the region. Projects promulgating the religion in southern Peru were noted in the 1980s among the Aymara people.

== Recent situation ==
=== Socio-economic development ===
Since its inception the religion has had involvement in socio-economic development beginning by giving greater freedom to women, promulgating the promotion of female education as a priority concern, and that involvement was given practical expression by creating schools, agricultural coops, and clinics. The religion entered a new phase of activity when a message of the Universal House of Justice dated 20 October 1983 was released. Baháʼís were urged to seek out ways, compatible with the Baháʼí teachings, in which they could become involved in the social and economic development of the communities in which they lived. World-wide in 1979 there were 129 officially recognized Baháʼí socio-economic development projects. By 1987, the number of officially recognized development projects had increased to 1482.

Since 1977 the international Baháʼí community has established several radio stations worldwide, particularly in the Americas. Programmes may include local news, music, topics related to socio-economic and community development, educational programmes focusing on indigenous language and culture, and Baháʼí introductory and deepening material. A project studied these radio stations through faculty from Northwestern University from 1980–1982, and briefly in 1983, and reviewed Baháʼí Radio projects in Peru and Bolivia as well and resulted in a PhD by Kurt John Hein in 1985 following which he took up service at WLGI Radio Baháʼí. A Baháʼí radio station was established in Peru to nurture and preserve the local culture by featuring local story-tellers and music recorded at station-sponsored annual indigenous music festivals. With regular feedback from experienced institutions operating out of the Baháʼí World Centre progress was maintained in developments of the radio stations in communication with the Audio-Visual Department at the Baháʼí administrative offices. In 1980 almost the entire staff of the radio station in Ecuador traveled to Peru to make extensive presentations to the international Baháʼí media conference in Puno where the second Baháʼí Radio station would be set up. Staff for projects in Bolivia, Chile and Peru participated in successive training and Ecuadoran staff traveled to Peru and Bolivia to assist in those projects. In the feedback it was highlighted that:

"The most important and indispensable thing is to maintain a happy, loving, spirited team-family. Try to have as high a percentage as possible of your staff native. At least 75%. It is far better to let a native do something wrong than not to give him the opportunity by having a foreigner do it."

In Peru one development for the International Youth Year was when about five hundred youth from eighteen countries in Latin America, North America and Europe attended a Youth Conference in Lima in 1985. Among the tribes and native groups represented were the Aymaras and Quechuas (Ecuador, Bolivia, Peru), the Mapuches (Chile) and the Aguarunas (Peru). Forty-seven youth organizations were officially represented on panels. Organized under the guidance of the Baháʼí National Assembly of Peru, the conference was opened by Dr. Angel Degado, acting mayor of Lima. The gathering culminated in the creation of eight national and international youth projects including the planting of some 2000 plants in Lima's Grau Square.

==== Other endeavors ====
• In 2000 Peru abstained from a United Nations human rights resolution about concern over the Baháʼís in Iran.

• The Baháʼí community of Peru cooperated with the Ministerio Internacional de Desarrollo to promote religious inter-faith understanding aimed at winning wider government recognition for non-Catholic religions, leading to the establishment of a new national Directorate of Interfaith Affairs.

== 2008 Regional conference ==
Regional conferences were called for by the Universal House of Justice 20 October 2008 to celebrate recent achievements in grassroots community-building and to plan their next steps in organizing in their home areas. Just a month later a regional conference was hosted in Ecuador by the National Spiritual Assembly of the Baháʼís of Ecuador in November 2008 and attracted over 1000 Baháʼís.

=== Demographics ===
The US government acknowledged Baha'is in Peru as early as 2005 and the Association of Religion Data Archives (relying mostly on the World Christian Encyclopedia) estimated some 41,300 Baháʼís in 2010.

== See also ==
- Baháʼí Faith by country
- History of Peru
- Religion in Peru
- Baháʼí Faith and Native Americans
