= Cancha Rayada =

Plain in Chile

Coordinates: 35°24′19.77″S 71°38′45.03″W

Cancha Rayada is a plain in the north of the city of Talca in Central Chile. Before urbanization the place was in the outskirts of the city. Cancha Rayada is bounded to north and west by Claro River. Cancha Rayada is best known for being the location of two important battles in the Chilean War of Independence, in 1814 and 1818, both of them royalist victories:

- First Battle of Cancha Rayada (March 29, 1814), also known as the Disaster of Cancha Rayada, a Patriot defeat during the Patria Vieja Campaign
- Second Battle of Cancha Rayada (March 19, 1818), also known as the Surprise of Cancha Rayada, a Patriot defeat during the Patria Nueva Campaign
