= Wayra Q'asa (Angaraes) =

Mountain in Peru

- Location within Peru

Highest point
- Elevation: 4,800 m (15,700 ft)
- Coordinates: 13°07′06″S 74°45′42″W

Geography
- Location: Peru, Huancavelica Region
- Parent range: Andes

Wayra Q'asa (Quechua wayra wind, q'asa mountain pass, "wind pass", Hispanicized spelling Huayraccasa) is a mountain in the Andes of Peru, about 4,800 metres (15,748 ft) high. It is situated in the Huancavelica Region, Angaraes Province, Lircay District. Wayra Q'asa lies southwest of Hatun Rit'i, northwest of Qiwllaqucha and northeast of Puka Q'asa.
