= Ayacuchos =

Nickname of military courtiers in 1840s Spain

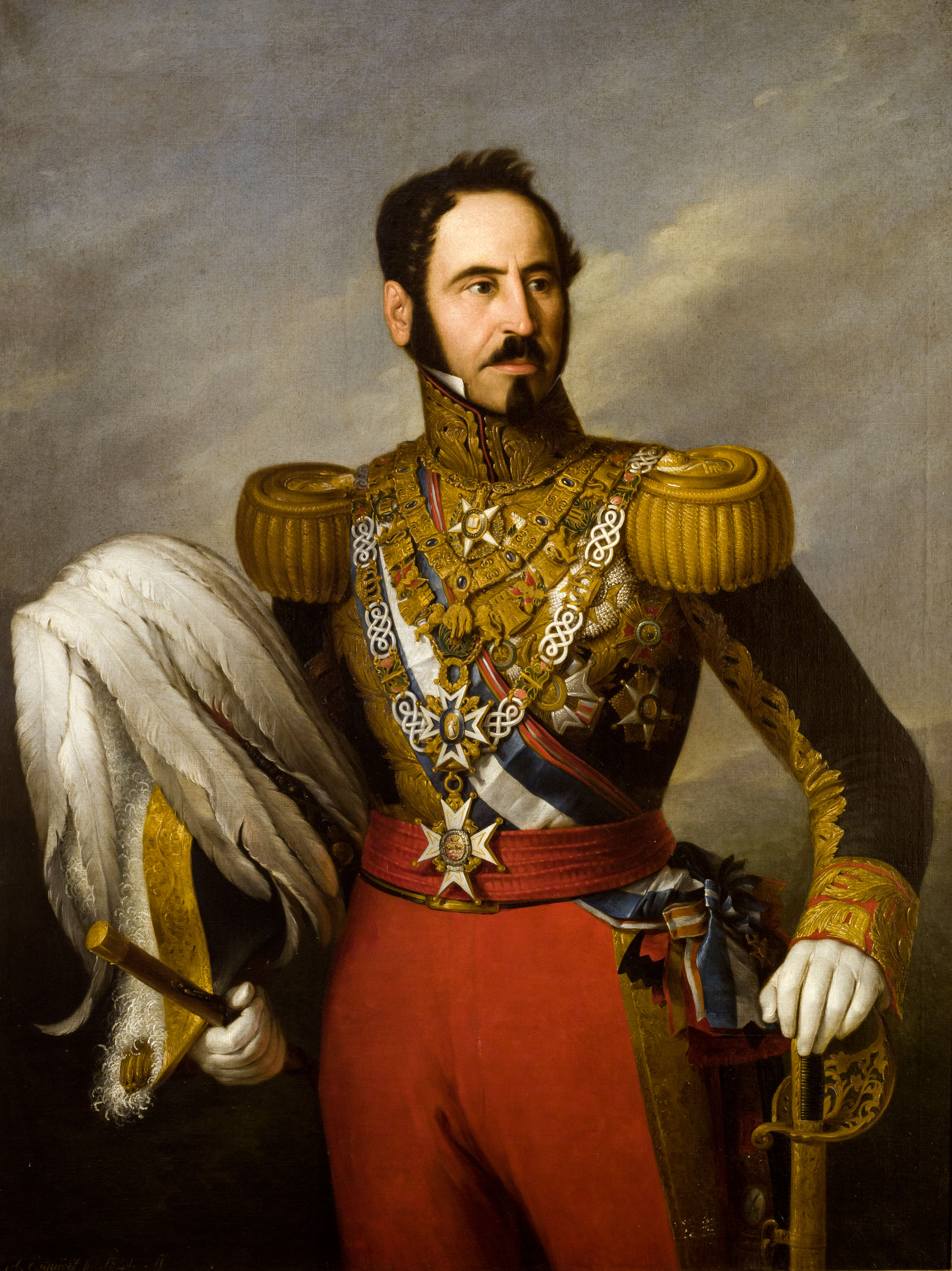
General Baldomero Espartero, leader of the military known as the "Ayacuchos".

Ayacuchos is the nickname given by the opponents of the Spanish general Baldomero Espartero to the military men grouped around him and who formed a "camarilla" that had a notable influence during his regency (1840–1843) and with whom they shared the liberal-progressive political orientation (among others: José Ramón Rodil, Andrés García Camba, Isidro Alaix, Antonio Seoane and Francisco Linage, his military secretary). The name comes from the fact that all of them had participated in the Battle of Ayacucho (1824) that put an end to the Spanish American wars of independence, although curiously, Espartero himself did not participate in the battle of Ayacucho, as he was captured shortly after disembarking. By extension, the term was also used — although the expression "espadón" was preferred — to refer to the military men who played a leading role in the political life of the reign of Isabella II of Spain, of different political orientation (Espartero, Narváez, O'Donnell, Prim or Serrano).

== Origin ==
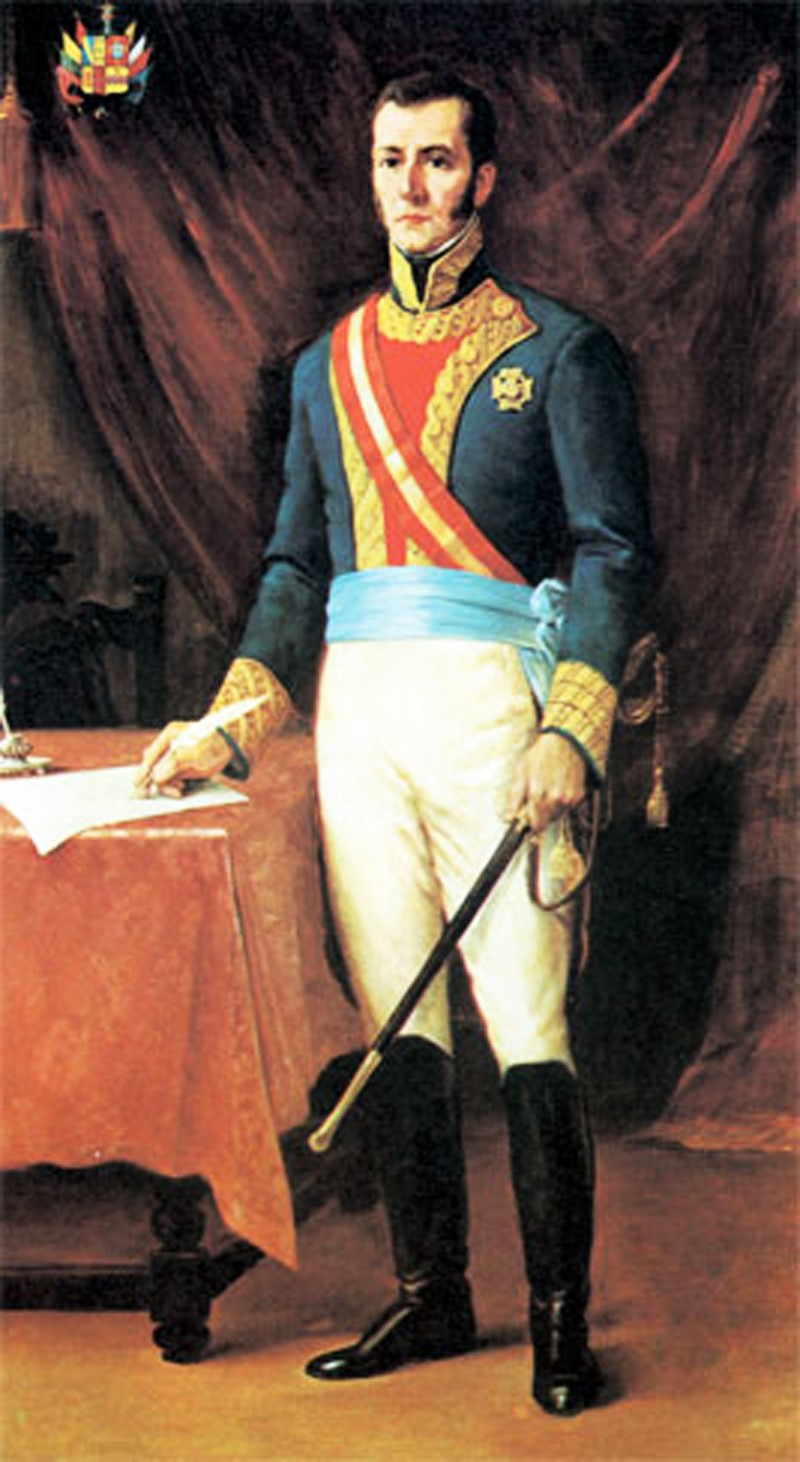
General José de la Serna.

The group of military that the anti-sparterist opposition called in a derogatory tone as the "ayacuchos" has its origin in the relations that the chiefs and officers under the orders of General José de la Serna, of liberal ideas, maintained during their stay in Peru.

These military men were generals who enjoyed the maximum confidence of General Baldomero Espartero because they had fought and developed their military career with him in the Spanish-American wars of independence, and hence the name "ayacuchos" — in reference to the last battle of that war, a battle in which Espartero did not participate. Back in Spain the group maintained the clientelistic relations of mutual support during the First Carlist War around Espartero, which would continue after Espartero assumed the regency. This group of "ayacuchos" included, among others, General Antonio Seoane, General Antonio Van Halen, General Martín Zurbano, General José Ramón Rodil y Gayoso and General Francisco Linage, who was Espartero's secretary. Generals José de Canterac, Andrés García Camba, Gerónimo Valdés, Landazuri, Valentín Ferraz and Alejandro González Villalobos were also part of this group.

This group also included the Carlist general Rafael Maroto, which according to some historians would explain the relative ease with which the agreement known as the Convention of Vergara was reached between two former comrades-in-arms and which put an end to the First Carlist War in the Basque Country and Navarre.

=== Generals who were members of the "Ayacuchos" ===
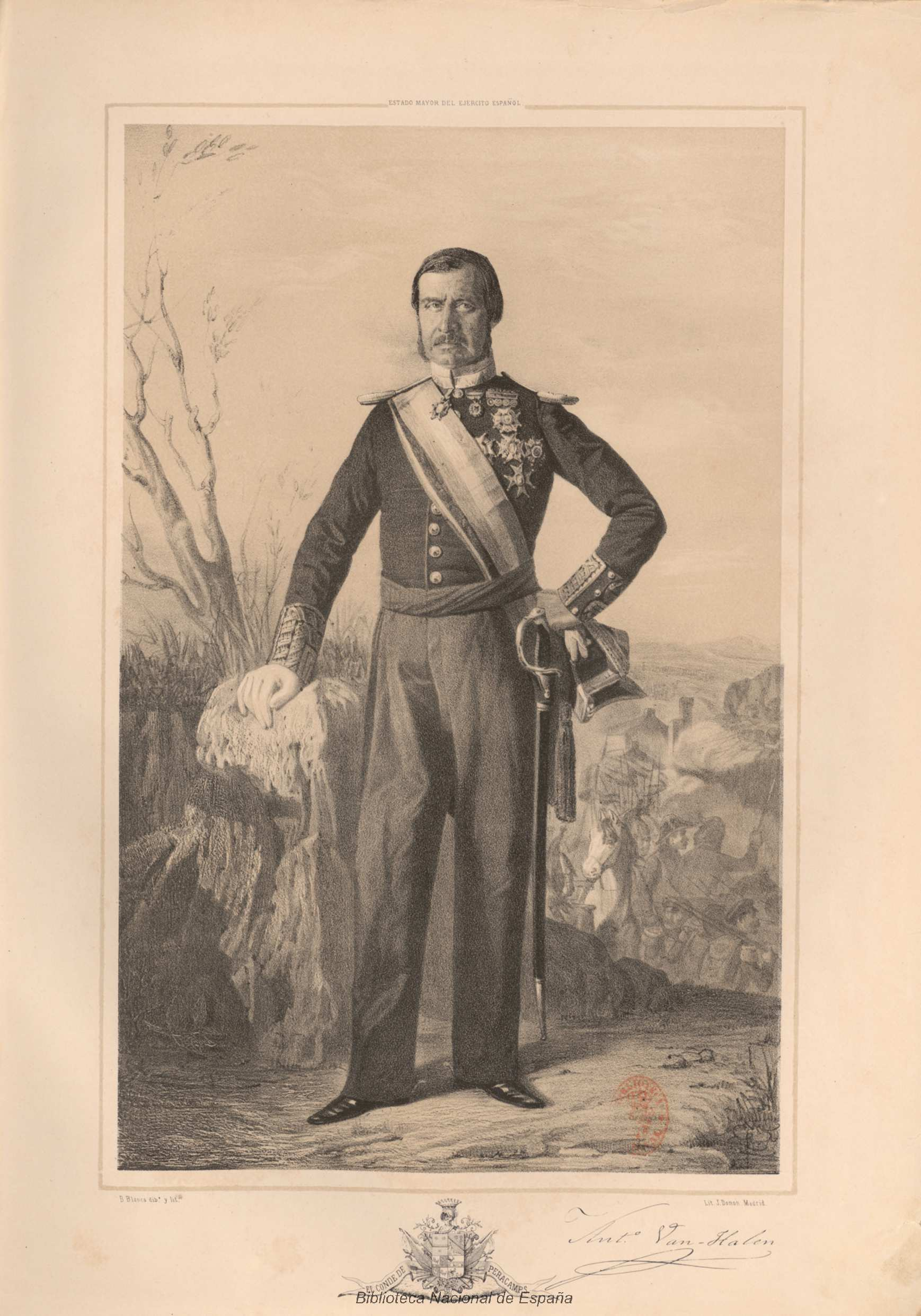
Antonio Van Halen.

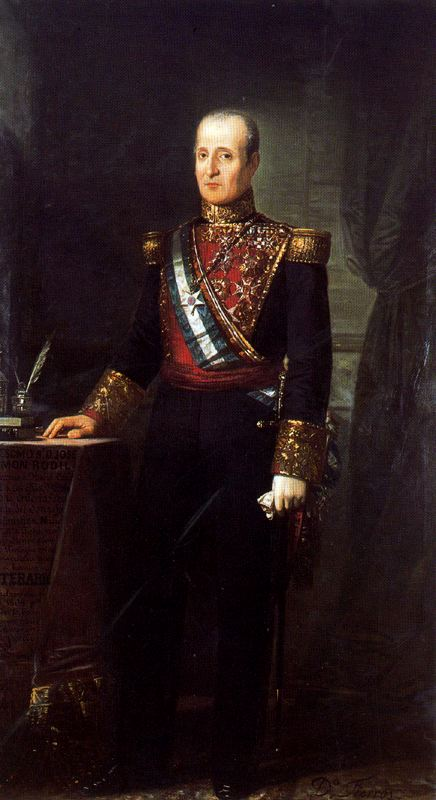
José Ramón Rodil.

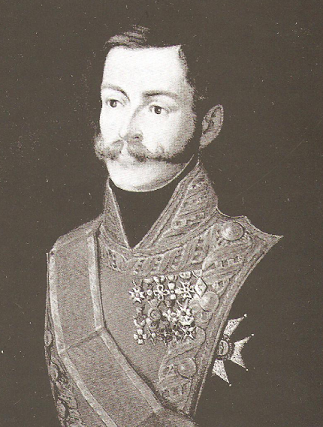
José de Canterac.

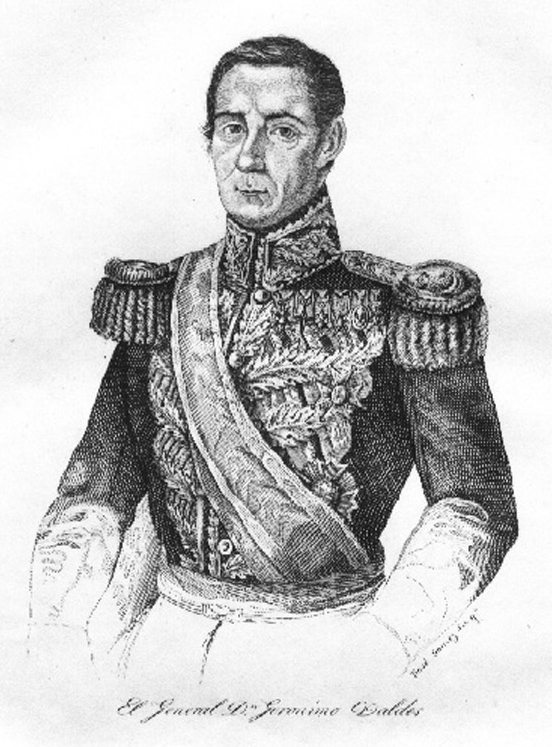
Gerónimo Valdés

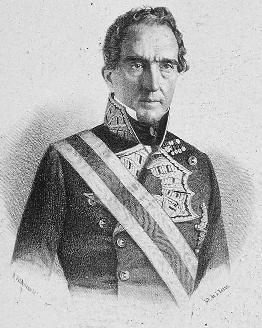
Andrés García Camba.

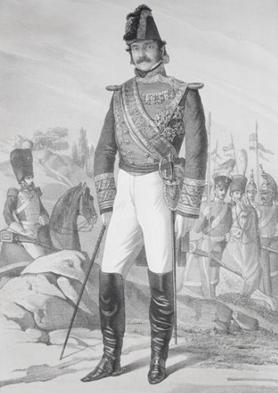
Valentín Ferraz.

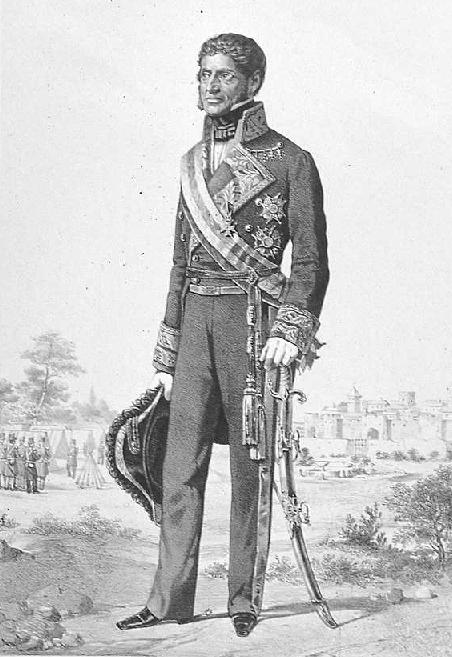
Alejandro González Villalobos.

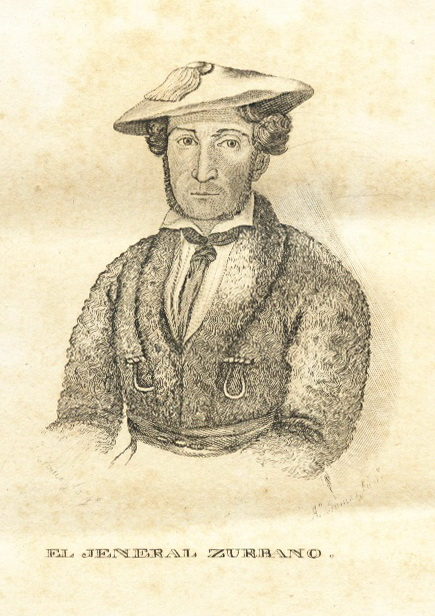
Martín Zurbano.

== Criticism during Espartero's Regency ==
Shortly after assuming the regency at the end of 1840, Espartero was accused by certain sectors of the army and the moderate and progressive parties that his policy of military appointments—and in some cases also civilian—favored only the members of his military camarilla known by his opponents as the "ayacuchos".

To the favoritism towards the "ayacuchos" was added the uneasiness of the army due to the delays in the payments to the officers and the difficulties they had to promote and develop their military career. But this was not Espartero's fault, but rather the existence of an underlying problem: the excessive number of officers, chiefs and generals at that time, a product of the almost permanent wars in which Spain had been involved between 1808 and 1840. A problem notably aggravated by the Convention of Vergara that allowed the entrance in the army of the Carlist officers, and to which many of them had been welcomed. Thus, the State was unable to face the economic cost of an army with an inflated staff, which the republican Fernando Garrido defined some years later as "the most expensive in the world". Thus "pay became more and more sporadic and the army became a source of protests. One regiment even went on strike in 1841".

According to Juan Francisco Fuentes, "this created a vicious circle that was very difficult to break: the military wanted to collect their pay, prosper in their career and have a destination in accordance with their rank. The rulers, for their part, whether civilian or military, lacked the political courage to address the necessary reform of the army, which required a drastic reduction in the ranks, but by maintaining such a state of affairs, they perpetuated the discontent of the military and their willingness to participate in all kinds of political adventures". He also encouraged the creation of a corporatist and militarist discourse through the newspapers with such significant names as El Grito del Ejército, or El Archivo militar, which he even wrote in his issue of September 30, 1841:

We cannot and do not want to say: the State is us, but we will say: the homeland, or if you please, the purest part of the homeland is us.

== Later "Ayacuchos" and "espadones" ==
In the Restoration period, characterized by civilian predominance, the gravitation of the military and its special relationship with the king (Alfonso XII, who was trained at the English Royal Academy of Sandhurst; and Alfonso XIII) was an essential characteristic of the political system, which surfaced at critical moments such as the scandal of the Cu-Cut! or the crisis of 1917. The scandal following the disaster of Annual (1921) made this relationship clear, and led to the military dictatorship of Miguel Primo de Rivera.

Military pronunciamientos continued, first in favor of the Republic (Jaca uprising) and then against it (Sanjurjada), until the conspiracy led by General Mola that triggered the Spanish Civil War, after which the prolonged Franco regime (1936-1975) was established.

The sabre rattling during the Spanish Transition was a constantly present element, which only materialized in the coup d'état attempts, the most spectacular of which was the 23 F. Also decisive was the role of the military democrats in different governments (Gutiérrez Mellado and Sáenz de Santamaría).

== Bibliography ==
- Bahamonde, Ángel; Martínez, Jesús A. (2012). Historia de España. Siglo XIX (in Spanish). Original edition: 1994 (6th ed.). Madrid: Cátedra. ISBN 978-84-376-1049-8.
- Fuentes, Juan Francisco (2007). El fin del Antiguo Régimen (1808-1868). Política y sociedad (in Spanish). Madrid: Síntesis. ISBN 978-84-975651-5-8.
