= Chincho District =

Coordinates: 12.9729°S 74.3673°W

Chincho
- District
- Interactive map of Chincho
- Country: Peru
- Region: Huancavelica
- Province: Angaraes
- Founded: October 31, 1959
- Capital: Chincho

Government
  - Mayor: Ruben Quispe De La Cruz

Area
  - Total: 182.7 km^{2} (70.5 sq mi)
- Elevation: 3,134 m (10,282 ft)

Population (2005 census)
  - Total: 946
  - Density: 5.18/km^{2} (13.4/sq mi)
- Time zone: UTC-5 (PET)
- UBIGEO: 090305

Chincho District is one of the twelve districts in the province Angaraes in Peru.

== Ethnic groups ==
The people in the district are mainly Indigenous citizens of Quechua descent. Quechua is the language which the majority of the population (68.79%) learnt to speak in childhood, 30.64% of the residents started speaking using the Spanish language (2007 Peru Census).

== See also ==
- Kachimayu
