= San Antonio de Antaparco District =

Coordinates: 13.0764°S 74.4115°W

San Antonio de Antaparco Antaparqu
- District
- Interactive map of San Antonio de Antaparco
- Country: Peru
- Region: Huancavelica
- Province: Angaraes
- Founded: April 7, 1954
- Capital: Antaparco

Government
  - Mayor: León Pedro Condori Huarcaya

Area
  - Total: 33.42 km^{2} (12.90 sq mi)
- Elevation: 2,771 m (9,091 ft)

Population (2005 census)
  - Total: 855
  - Density: 25.6/km^{2} (66.3/sq mi)
- Time zone: UTC-5 (PET)
- UBIGEO: 090310

San Antonio de Antaparco District is one of twelve districts of the province Angaraes in Peru.

== Ethnic groups ==
The people in the district are mainly Indigenous citizens of Quechua descent. Quechua is the language which the majority of the population (88.86%) learnt to speak in childhood, 10.93% of the residents started speaking using the Spanish language (2007 Peru Census).
