= Qiwllaqucha (Angaraes) =

Mountain in Peru

- Location within Peru

Highest point
- Elevation: 4,800 m (15,700 ft)
- Coordinates: 13°08′17″S 74°45′42″W

Geography
- Location: Peru, Huancavelica Region
- Parent range: Andes

Qiwllaqucha (Quechua qillwa, qiwlla, qiwiña gull, qucha lake, "gull lake", Hispanicized spelling Jeullacocha) is a mountain in the Andes of Peru, about 4,800 m (15,748 ft) high. It is situated in the Huancavelica Region, Angaraes Province, Lircay District. Qiwllaqucha lies southwest of Hatun Rit'i and south of Wayra Q'asa.
