= Talca =

City in Chile

- City and commune
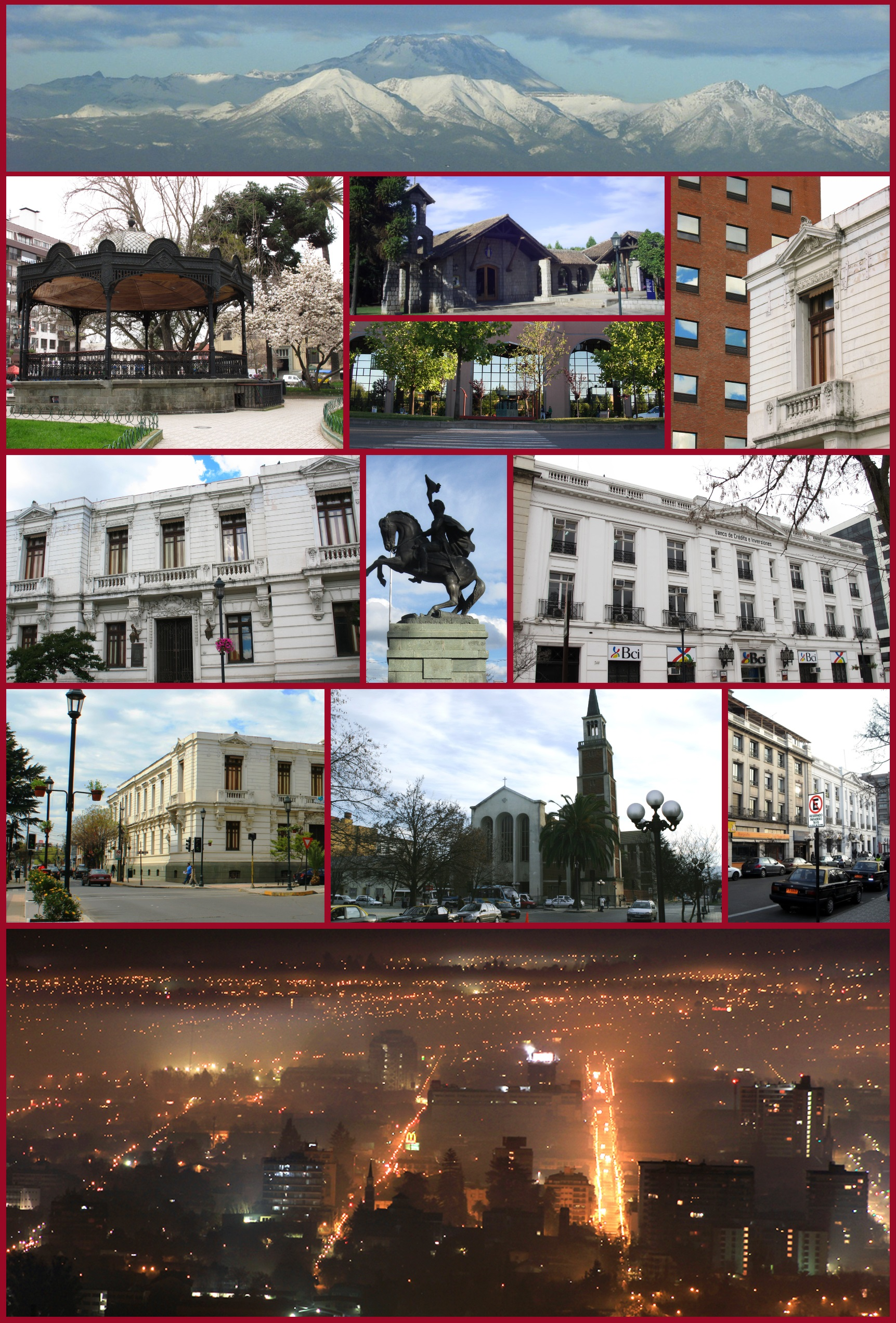
- 1º row: Andes mountains in Talca. 2º row: (left) Town square of Talca, (centre-top) Catholic University of the Maule, (centre-down) Ancient Library of the University of Talca, (right) architectural contrasts. 3º row: Old Intendancy of Maule, statue of Bernardo O'Higgins, BCI Bank. 4º row: 1 Norte street, St. Augustine Cathedral, and 1 Sur street. 5º row: Nocturnal cityscape of Talca.

- Coat of arms Location of Talca commune in Maule Region Location in Chile
- Coordinates: 35°25′37″S 71°39′56″W
- Country: Chile
- Region: Maule
- Province: Talca
- Founded: May 12, 1742

Government
  - Type: Municipality
  - Alcalde: Juan Carlos Díaz Avendaño

Area
  - Total: 231.5 km^{2} (89.4 sq mi)
- Elevation: 102 m (335 ft)

Population (2024)
  - Total: 232,131
  - Density: 1,003/km^{2} (2,597/sq mi)
- Demonym: Talquino
- Time zone: UTC−4 (CLT)
  - Summer (DST): UTC−3 (CLST)
- Postal code: 3460000
- Area code: 56 (country) + 712 (Talca Province)
- Climate: Csb
- Website: talca.cl (in Spanish)

Talca (Spanish pronunciation: [ˈtalka]) is a city and commune in Chile located about 255 km (158 mi) south of Santiago, and is the capital of both Talca Province and Maule Region. It has 232,131 inhabitants.

The city is an important economic center, with agricultural (wheat) and manufacturing activities, as well as wine production. It is also the location of the Universidad de Talca and the Catholic University of Maule, among others. The Catholic Church of Talca has held a prominent role in the history of Chile.

== History ==
The city was founded in 1692 by Tomás Marín de Poveda and refounded as Villa San Agustín de Talca in 1742 by José Antonio Manso de Velasco.

The city played a role in Chile's independence. For example, the siege of Talca took place there on March 4, 1814, and the Battle of Cancha Rayada on March 29 and the Second battle of Cancha Rayada, on March 16. 1818. Also, on February 12, 1818, Bernardo O'Higgins signed the Chilean declaration of independence.

Talca Province was founded in 1833. This ended the dependency of Colchagua Province. Also, Talca was a focus of insurrection during the revolutions of 1851 and 1859.

Talca was partially destroyed by the 1928 Talca earthquake and the 2010 Chile earthquake, being rebuilt both times. It sits near the epicenter of the 2010 8.8 magnitude earthquake and suffered severe shaking causing the collapse of much of the historic town centre.

== Geography ==
The commune of Talca spans an area of 231.5 km^{2} (89 sq mi). The city of Talca is located 250 km (155 mi) south of Santiago, south of the confluence of the rivers Lircay and Claro, in the Central Valley. The city is bisected by the Pan-American Highway.

=== Climate ===
Talca has a Mediterranean climate (Köppen: Csb) with dry summers and wet winters, though it is hotter in summer and cooler in winter than coastal cities like Valparaíso and Concepción.

Climate data for Talca (1976–2005)
Month	Jan	Feb	Mar	Apr	May	Jun	Jul	Aug	Sep	Oct	Nov	Dec	Year
Mean daily maximum °C (°F)	30.3 (86.5)	29.5 (85.1)	26.8 (80.2)	21.5 (70.7)	16.4 (61.5)	13.4 (56.1)	13.1 (55.6)	15.3 (59.5)	18.1 (64.6)	21.6 (70.9)	25.4 (77.7)	28.7 (83.7)	21.7 (71.1)
Daily mean °C (°F)	21.2 (70.2)	20.3 (68.5)	17.4 (63.3)	13.4 (56.1)	10.5 (50.9)	8.7 (47.7)	7.9 (46.2)	9.1 (48.4)	11.3 (52.3)	14.1 (57.4)	17.1 (62.8)	20.1 (68.2)	14.2 (57.6)
Mean daily minimum °C (°F)	12.4 (54.3)	11.9 (53.4)	9.8 (49.6)	7.5 (45.5)	6.3 (43.3)	5.1 (41.2)	4.2 (39.6)	4.5 (40.1)	5.8 (42.4)	7.6 (45.7)	9.6 (49.3)	11.9 (53.4)	8.1 (46.6)
Average rainfall mm (inches)	4.0 (0.16)	3.9 (0.15)	13.3 (0.52)	33.8 (1.33)	115.8 (4.56)	146.2 (5.76)	155.1 (6.11)	85.9 (3.38)	53.1 (2.09)	34.3 (1.35)	19.4 (0.76)	11.5 (0.45)	676.2 (26.62)
Average relative humidity (%)	58.2	62.7	69.4	78.1	86.9	89.5	88.7	85.0	79.2	72.7	64.1	58.9	74.4
Mean monthly sunshine hours	359.6	288.2	263.5	168.0	105.4	75.0	93.0	145.7	183.0	248.0	300.0	337.9	2,567.3
Source: University de Talca

== Demographics ==
Historical population
Year	Pop.	±% p.a.
1875	24,336	—
1885	28,184	+1.48%
1895	37,642	+2.94%
1907	42,374	+0.99%
1920	43,052	+0.12%
1930	54,956	+2.47%
1940	56,735	+0.32%
1952	63,533	+0.95%
1970	105,529	+2.86%
1982	142,600	+2.54%
1992	171,287	+1.85%
2002	201,797	+1.65%
2017	220,357	+0.59%
2024	232,131	+0.75%
Source: INE, Memoria Chilena

As of the 2024 census, the population is 232,131, of which 47.8% are male and 52.2% are female. People under 15 years old make up 17.4% of the population, and people over 65 years old make up 14.7%. 94.7% of the population is urban and 5.3% is rural.

=== Immigration ===
As of the 2024 census, immigrants make up 6.8% of the population - 6.0% are from South America, 0.7% from North America, 0.1% from Europe, 0.1% from Asia, 0.01% from Africa, and 0.003% from Oceania.

== Administration ==
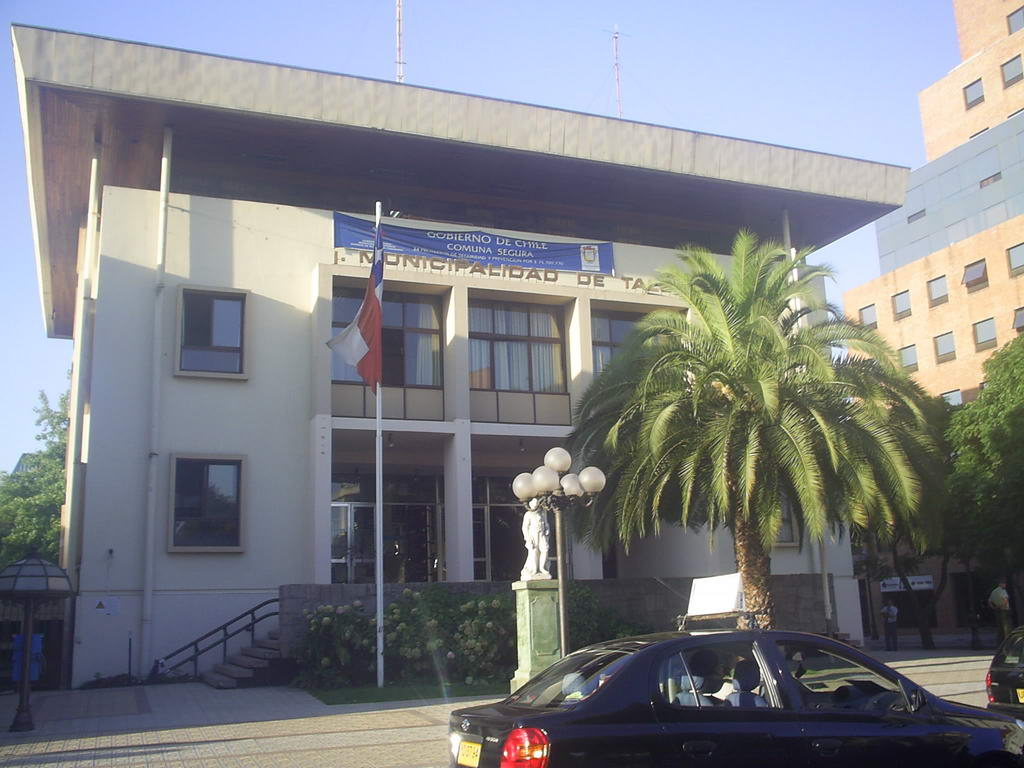
Municipal building of Talca

As a commune, Talca is a third-level administrative division of Chile administered by a municipal council, headed by an alcalde who is directly elected every four years. The 2008–2012 alcalde is Juan Castro Prieto (Independent Democratic Union, centre-right).

Within the electoral divisions of Chile, Talca is represented in the Chamber of Deputies by Sergio Aguiló (PS) and Germán Verdugo (RN) as part of the 37th electoral district, which consists entirely of the Talca commune. The commune is represented in the Senate by Juan Antonio Coloma Correa (UDI) and Andrés Zaldívar Larraín (PDC) as part of the 10th senatorial constituency (Maule-North).

== Economy ==
=== Primary sector ===
The region's natural resource base is diverse, but agriculture plays a fundamental role in Talca's economy. Currently, common crops include vegetables, fruit, and cereals, cultivated in rural sectors of the commune such as Huilquilemu, Lircay, El Oriente, Victoria, Aurora, and Panguilemo, among others. However, it is the vineyards that hold particular importance, as the Maule Valley—whose main city is Talca—is the largest wine-producing area in Chile, accounting for about 45% of the national total. Livestock farming (mainly pigs and poultry) is also significant, as it supports major industries in the region. Mining, once represented by the El Chivato (gold) deposit, is currently inactive.

=== Secondary and tertiary sectors ===
Talca is the main industrial center of the region and the Central Valley. It hosts industries primarily focused on processing the area's agricultural resources. Prominent sectors include paper, wood, plastics, and metallurgy industries, as well as canning, milling, food, and beverage production—for example, Calaf—and meat and sausage processing (especially beef, pork, and poultry), with Productos Fernández standing out. The wine industry is also notable. The arrival of immigrant entrepreneurs (Spanish, Arab, Italian, and German) was crucial in strengthening local manufacturing and trade. Additionally, hydroelectric development in the province of Talca further boosted industrial activity, particularly through the Colbún-Machicura power plant, built in the 1980s. However, several major earthquakes (1928, 1939, and 1960) and the excessive political and economic centralization of Chile around Santiago have hindered Talca's industrial growth, especially since the second half of the 20th century. The city is an important commercial and service hub. Its main commercial artery is 1 Sur Street, where, along with 1 Norte Street, most banks, financial institutions, retail stores, and major department stores are located. Talca also has three shopping centers (malls) located in different areas of the city:

- Plaza Maule: located in the eastern sector, it has undergone several façade changes and expansions. Its name bears no relation to the Santiago-based Mallplaza chain.
- Portal Centro: located in the city center, it also houses a clinic on its upper floors.
- Go Florida: located in the southwestern area, designed as an outlet-type shopping space.

In 2018, the number of registered companies in Talca was 6,724. The Economic Complexity Index (ECI) for the same year was 2.21, while the economic activities with the highest Revealed Comparative Advantage (RCA) index were Glass Recycling (133.98), Uranium and Thorium Mining (133.98), and Forest Fire Control Services (65.89).

== Transport ==
Talca has a public bus system managed by the municipal Department of Transportation. The routes are tracked through Moovit.

== International relations ==
The city of Talca hosts a series of international relations institutions, such as the Regional Unit for International Affairs (URAI) of the Regional Government of Maule, which is responsible for analyzing and managing the region's bilateral and multilateral relations with Latin America and the rest of the world; the Regional Unit for Investment Promotion and Attraction; the Regional Office of the National Migration Service; the Regional Office of the General Directorate for Export Promotion (ProChile); the Department of Migration and International Police of the Investigations Police; and the Migrant Office of the Municipality of Talca.

=== Internationalization in Higher Education ===
In the field of international relations and higher education, the main actors in Talca are the Office of International Relations of the University of Talca and the Office of National and International Relations of the Catholic University of Maule. Although to a lesser extent, student mobility is also promoted through the International Experience Program of the Santo Tomás University and the Office of International Relations of the Autonomous University, as well as by technical training centers such as the San Agustín Technical Training Center (CFT San Agustín).

=== Consulates ===
- Austria (Honorary Consulate)
- Spain (Honorary Consulate)
- Morocco (Honorary Consulate)
- Indonesia (Honorary Consulate)
- Italy (Honorary Vice Consulate)

== Gallery ==
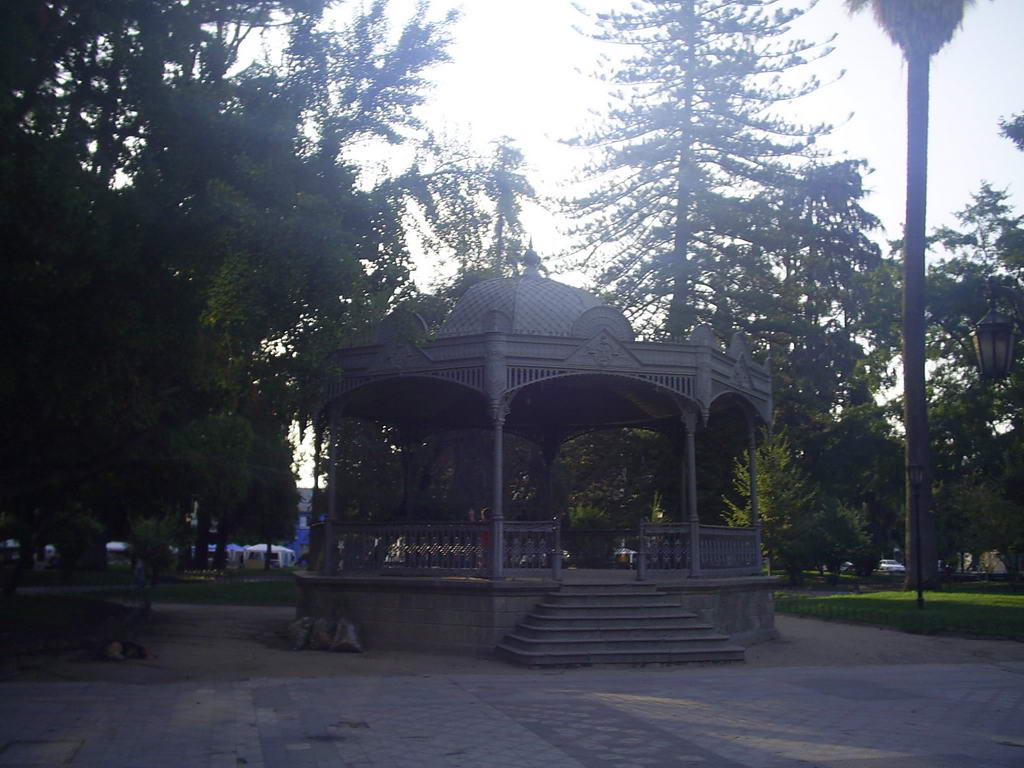
A garden pavilion in Plaza de Armas (Armas Square)

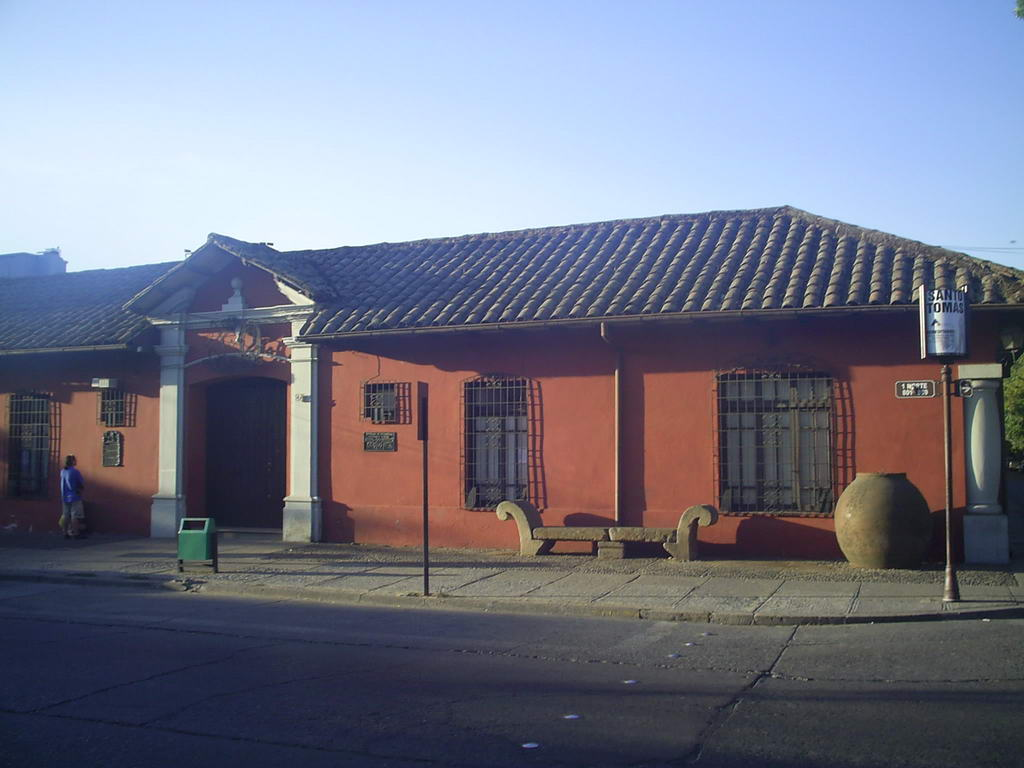
O'Higginian Historical Museum (Museo Histórico O'Higginiano)

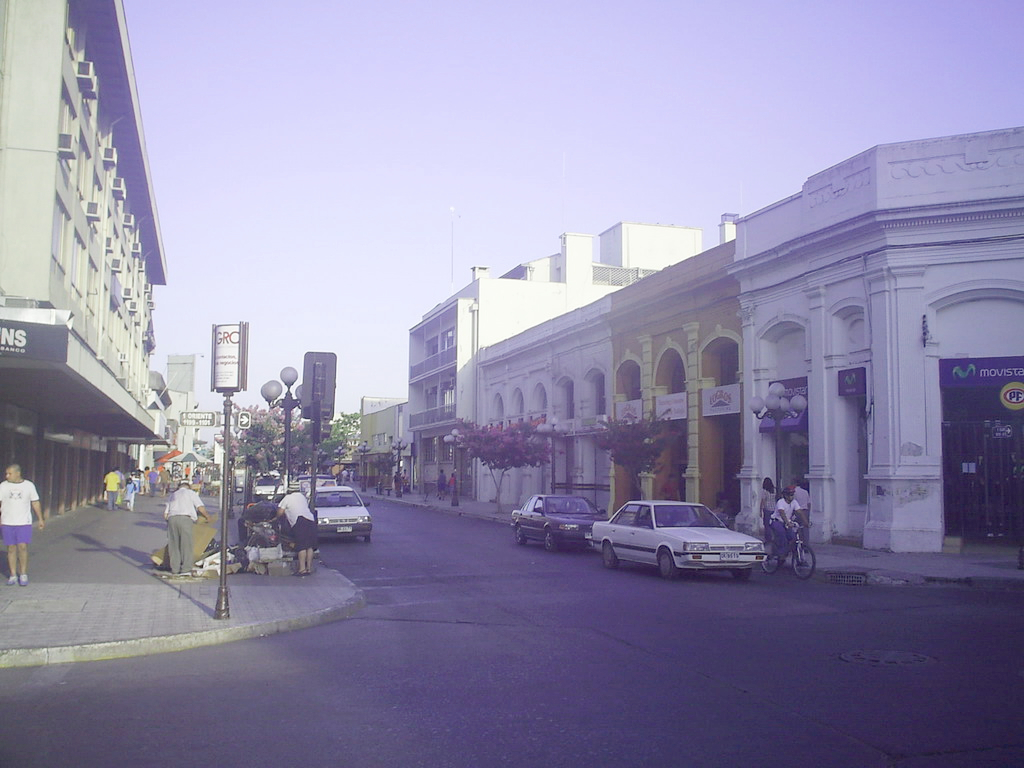
Calle Sur de Talca (Talca Southern Street)

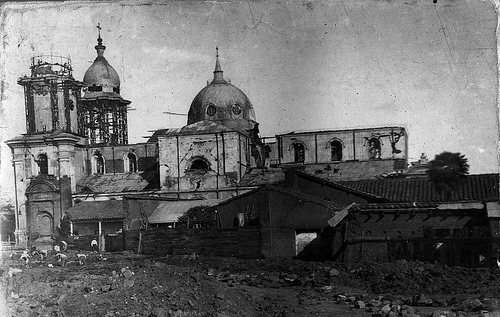
Aftermath in damage at Talca Cathedral, by 1928 Talca earthquake

== See also ==
- Agustín Abarca
- Maule River
- Descabezado Grande
- Radal Siete Tazas National Reserve
- Altos de Lircay National Reserve
- Juan Albano Pereira Márquez
- Carolina Huidobro
