= Congalla District =

Coordinates: 12.9560°S 74.4923°W

Congalla
- District
- Interactive map of Congalla
- Country: Peru
- Region: Huancavelica
- Province: Angaraes
- Founded: September 3, 1941
- Capital: Congalla

Government
  - Mayor: Cesario León Ramos

Area
  - Total: 215.64 km^{2} (83.26 sq mi)
- Elevation: 3,523 m (11,558 ft)

Population (2005 census)
  - Total: 4,762
  - Density: 22.08/km^{2} (57.19/sq mi)
- Time zone: UTC-5 (PET)
- UBIGEO: 090306

Congalla District is one of twelve districts of the province Angaraes in Peru.

== Ethnic groups ==
The people in the district are mainly Indigenous citizens of Quechua descent. Quechua is the language which the majority of the population (94.08%) learnt to speak in childhood, 5.38% of the residents started speaking using the Spanish language (2007 Peru Census).
