= Anchonga District =

Coordinates: 12.9131°S 74.6914°W

Anchonga
- District
- Interactive map of Anchonga
- Country: Peru
- Region: Huancavelica
- Province: Angaraes
- Founded: January 5, 1945
- Capital: Anchonga

Government
  - Mayor: Octavio Javier Quispe

Area
  - Total: 72.4 km^{2} (28.0 sq mi)
- Elevation: 3,298 m (10,820 ft)

Population (2005 census)
  - Total: 7,282
  - Density: 101/km^{2} (261/sq mi)
- Time zone: UTC-5 (PET)
- UBIGEO: 090302

Anchonga District is one of twelve districts of the province Angaraes in Peru.

== Ethnic groups ==
The people in the district are mainly Indigenous citizens of Quechua descent. Quechua is the language which the majority of the population (92.71%) learnt to speak in childhood, 7.16% of the residents started speaking using the Spanish language (2007 Peru Census).
