= Huayllay Grande District =

Coordinates: 12.9424°S 74.7018°W

Huayllay Grande Wayllay
- District
- Interactive map of Huayllay Grande
- Country: Peru
- Region: Huancavelica
- Province: Angaraes
- Founded: February 28, 1941
- Capital: Huayllay Grande

Government
  - Mayor: Maximo Antonio Llancari

Area
  - Total: 33.28 km^{2} (12.85 sq mi)
- Elevation: 3,625 m (11,893 ft)

Population (2005 census)
  - Total: 1,430
  - Density: 43.0/km^{2} (111/sq mi)
- Time zone: UTC-5 (PET)
- UBIGEO: 090308

Huayllay Grande District is one of twelve districts of the province Angaraes in Peru.

== Ethnic groups ==
The people in the district are mainly Indigenous citizens of Quechua descent. Quechua is the language which the majority of the population (95.69%) learnt to speak in childhood, 4.05% of the residents started speaking using the Spanish language (2007 Peru Census).
