= Julcamarca District =

Coordinates: 13.0142°S 74.4442°W

Julcamarca
- District
- Interactive map of Julcamarca
- Country: Peru
- Region: Huancavelica
- Province: Angaraes
- Capital: Julcamarca

Government
  - Mayor: Carlos Saldaña Pineda

Area
  - Total: 48.61 km^{2} (18.77 sq mi)
- Elevation: 3,418 m (11,214 ft)

Population (2005 census)
  - Total: 1,307
  - Density: 26.89/km^{2} (69.64/sq mi)
- Time zone: UTC-5 (PET)
- UBIGEO: 090309

Julcamarca District is one of twelve districts of the province Angaraes in Peru.

== Ethnic groups ==
The people in the district are mainly Indigenous citizens of Quechua descent. Quechua is the language which the majority of the population (66.77%) learnt to speak in childhood, 32.72% of the residents started speaking using the Spanish language (2007 Peru Census).

== See also ==
- Kachimayu
