= Secclla District =

Coordinates: 13.0512°S 74.4839°W

Secclla Siqlla
- District
- Interactive map of Secclla
- Country: Peru
- Region: Huancavelica
- Province: Angaraes
- Founded: April 15, 1955
- Capital: Secclla

Government
  - Mayor: Orlando Valenzuela Ore

Area
  - Total: 167.99 km^{2} (64.86 sq mi)
- Elevation: 3,340 m (10,960 ft)

Population (2005 census)
  - Total: 3,210
  - Density: 19.1/km^{2} (49.5/sq mi)
- Time zone: UTC-5 (PET)
- UBIGEO: 090312

Secclla District is one of twelve districts of the Angaraes Province in Peru.

== Geography ==
One of the highest peaks of the district is Yana Urqu at approximately 4,600 m (15,100 ft). Other mountains are listed below:

- Aqu Urqu
- Asul Qaqa
- Kuntur Sinqa
- Kinwa Urqu
- K'ark'a Pata
- Paqu Chuku
- Pukaqucha
- Puma Ranra
- Punta Urqu
- Runtu Rumi
- Wayra Punta
- Yana Urqu

== Ethnic groups ==
The people in the district are mainly Indigenous citizens of Quechua descent. Quechua is the language which the majority of the population (88.41%) learnt to speak in childhood, 11.24% of the residents started speaking using the Spanish language (2007 Peru Census).
