= Callanmarca District =

Coordinates: 12.8669°S 74.6231°W

Callanmarca
- District
- Interactive map of Callanmarca
- Country: Peru
- Region: Huancavelica
- Province: Angaraes
- Founded: February 28, 1941
- Capital: Callanmarca

Area
  - Total: 26.02 km^{2} (10.05 sq mi)
- Elevation: 3,526 m (11,568 ft)

Population (2005 census)
  - Total: 1,006
  - Density: 38.66/km^{2} (100.1/sq mi)
- Time zone: UTC-5 (PET)
- UBIGEO: 090303

Callanmarca District is one of twelve districts of the province Angaraes in Peru.

== Ethnic groups ==
The people in the district are mainly Indigenous citizens of Quechua descent. Quechua is the language which the majority of the population (92.03%) learnt to speak in childhood, 7.85% of the residents started speaking using the Spanish language (2007 Peru Census).
