= Huanca-Huanca District =

Coordinates: 12.9189°S 74.6101°W

Huanca-Huanca
- District
- Interactive map of Huanca-Huanca
- Country: Peru
- Region: Huancavelica
- Province: Angaraes
- Founded: February 28, 1941
- Capital: Huanca-Huanca

Government
  - Mayor: Ismael Rojas Cuya

Area
  - Total: 109.96 km^{2} (42.46 sq mi)
- Elevation: 3,567 m (11,703 ft)

Population (2005 census)
  - Total: 1,664
  - Density: 15.13/km^{2} (39.19/sq mi)
- Time zone: UTC-5 (PET)
- UBIGEO: 090307

Huanca-Huanca District is one of twelve districts of the province Angaraes in Peru.

== Ethnic groups ==
The people in the district are mainly Indigenous citizens of Quechua descent. Quechua is the language which the majority of the population (94.07%) learnt to speak in childhood, 5.79% of the residents started speaking using the Spanish language (2007 Peru Census).
