= Yana Chuku =

Mountain in Peru

- Location within Peru

Highest point
- Elevation: 5,058 m (16,594 ft)
- Coordinates: 13°10′02″S 74°54′49″W

Geography
- Location: Peru, Huancavelica Region
- Parent range: Andes

Yana Chuku (Quechua yana black, chuku hat, "black hat", Hispanicized spelling Yanachuco) is a 5,058-metre-high (16,594 ft) mountain in the Andes of Peru. It lies in the Huancavelica Region, Angaraes Province, Lircay District, and in the Huancavelica Province, Huachocolpa District.
