= Ccochaccasa District =

Coordinates: 12.9275°S 74.7700°W

Quchaqasa
- District
- Interactive map of Quchaqasa
- Country: Peru
- Region: Huancavelica
- Province: Angaraes
- Founded: October 30, 1984
- Capital: Ccochaccasa

Government
  - Mayor: Alejandro Taipe Huaira

Area
  - Total: 116.6 km^{2} (45.0 sq mi)
- Elevation: 4,150 m (13,620 ft)

Population (2005 census)
  - Total: 3,532
  - Density: 30.29/km^{2} (78.45/sq mi)
- Time zone: UTC-5 (PET)
- UBIGEO: 090304

Ccochaccasa District is one of twelve districts of the province Angaraes in Peru.

== Ethnic groups ==
The people in the district are mainly Indigenous citizens of Quechua descent. Quechua is the language which the majority of the population (56.22%) learnt to speak in childhood, 43.62% of the residents started speaking using the Spanish language (2007 Peru Census).
