= Lircay District =

Coordinates: 12.9896°S 74.7205°W

Lircay
- District
- Interactive map of Lircay
- Country: Peru
- Region: Huancavelica
- Province: Angaraes
- Capital: Lircay

Government
  - Mayor: Raul Victor Anyaipoma Bendezu

Area
  - Total: 818.84 km^{2} (316.16 sq mi)
- Elevation: 3,278 m (10,755 ft)

Population (2005 census)
  - Total: 24,551
  - Density: 29.983/km^{2} (77.655/sq mi)
- Time zone: UTC-5 (PET)
- UBIGEO: 090301

Lircay District is one of twelve districts of the Angaraes Province in Peru.

== Geography ==
One of the highest peaks of the district is Yana Chuku at 5,058 m (16,594 ft). Other mountains are listed below:

- Aqu Arma
- Aya Pata Punta
- Chawpi Urqu
- Chimpa Urqu
- Chupa
- Chuqi
- Hapu Punta
- Hatun Rit'i
- Inkill Qaqa
- Iskay Siwi
- Iskayqucha
- Kuntur Wachana
- K'allapa Q'asa
- Misaqucha
- Machu Qaqa
- Parya
- Puka Q'asa
- Phutunqu
- Qiwllaqucha
- Qucha Q'asa
- Rayusqa
- Rit'i Parata
- Tampu Wayq'u
- Tawri Pachana
- Tiklla Urqu
- Titi Q'asa
- Tuqtu
- T'asta Pampa
- T'asta Q'asa
- T'uqu Pukyu
- Uqi Qullqa
- Urqu Wasi
- Wachulla
- Walla Q'asa
- Wayra Q'asa
- Wayta
- Willka Punta
- Wisk'achaniyuq
- Wiqu Sallana
- Yana Mach'ay
- Yana Rumi
- Yana Urqu
- Yana Ututu
- Yawrilla
- Yuraq Mach'ay

== Ethnic groups ==
The people in the district are mainly Indigenous citizens of Quechua descent. Quechua is the language which the majority of the population (70.32%) learnt to speak in childhood, 29.48% of the residents started speaking using the Spanish language (2007 Peru Census).

== Climate ==
Climate data for Lircay, elevation 3,303 m (10,837 ft), (1991–2020)
Month	Jan	Feb	Mar	Apr	May	Jun	Jul	Aug	Sep	Oct	Nov	Dec	Year
Mean daily maximum °C (°F)	19.3 (66.7)	18.8 (65.8)	19.0 (66.2)	20.0 (68.0)	20.7 (69.3)	20.4 (68.7)	20.3 (68.5)	20.7 (69.3)	21.0 (69.8)	21.0 (69.8)	21.7 (71.1)	20.1 (68.2)	20.2 (68.5)
Mean daily minimum °C (°F)	6.8 (44.2)	7.1 (44.8)	7.0 (44.6)	5.6 (42.1)	3.3 (37.9)	1.9 (35.4)	1.3 (34.3)	2.3 (36.1)	4.1 (39.4)	5.3 (41.5)	5.4 (41.7)	6.3 (43.3)	4.7 (40.4)
Average precipitation mm (inches)	142.7 (5.62)	147.3 (5.80)	114.4 (4.50)	54.1 (2.13)	24.8 (0.98)	10.7 (0.42)	14.9 (0.59)	16.4 (0.65)	29.4 (1.16)	51.7 (2.04)	53.2 (2.09)	103.4 (4.07)	763 (30.05)
Source: National Meteorology and Hydrology Service of Peru
