= Lircay, Peru =

Lircay
- Town
- Location within Peru
- Coordinates: 12°59′22.77″S 74°43′13.76″W
- Country: Peru
- Region: Huancavelica
- Province: Angaraes
- District: Lircay

Government
  - Mayor: Raul Victor Anyaipoma Bendezu
- Elevation: 3,278 m (10,755 ft)
- Time zone: UTC-5 (PET)

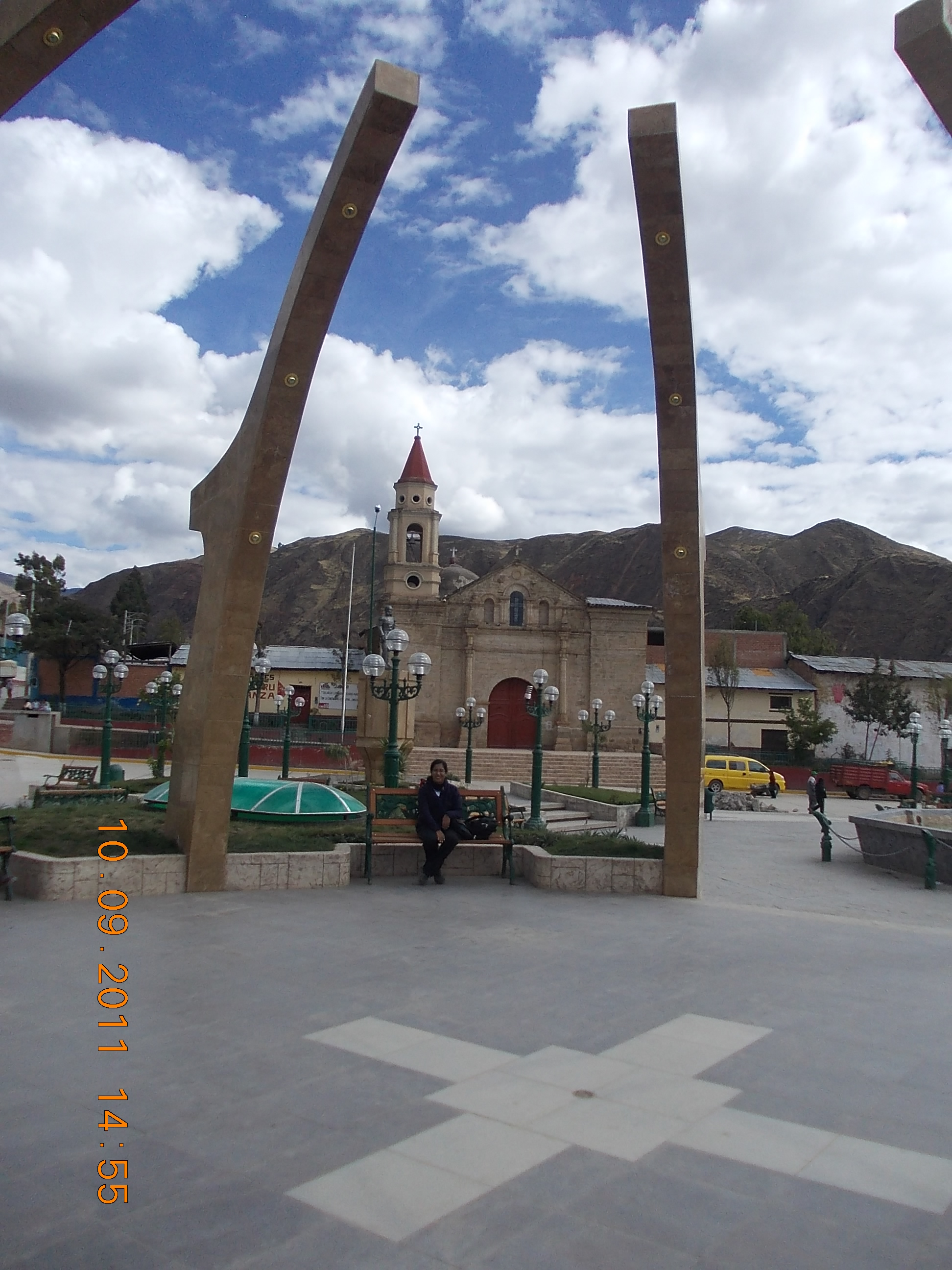
Lircay church

Lircay is a town in Central Peru, capital of the province Angaraes in the region Huancavelica. It is located at an altitude of 3,278 m. The town had a population according to the 2007 census of 6,563 people. Most of the people of the town belong to the native American race.

== Climate ==
Climate data for Lircay, elevation 3,303 m (10,837 ft), (1991–2020)
Month	Jan	Feb	Mar	Apr	May	Jun	Jul	Aug	Sep	Oct	Nov	Dec	Year
Mean daily maximum °C (°F)	19.3 (66.7)	18.8 (65.8)	19.0 (66.2)	20.0 (68.0)	20.7 (69.3)	20.4 (68.7)	20.3 (68.5)	20.7 (69.3)	21.0 (69.8)	21.0 (69.8)	21.7 (71.1)	20.1 (68.2)	20.2 (68.5)
Mean daily minimum °C (°F)	6.8 (44.2)	7.1 (44.8)	7.0 (44.6)	5.6 (42.1)	3.3 (37.9)	1.9 (35.4)	1.3 (34.3)	2.3 (36.1)	4.1 (39.4)	5.3 (41.5)	5.4 (41.7)	6.3 (43.3)	4.7 (40.4)
Average precipitation mm (inches)	142.7 (5.62)	147.3 (5.80)	114.4 (4.50)	54.1 (2.13)	24.8 (0.98)	10.7 (0.42)	14.9 (0.59)	16.4 (0.65)	29.4 (1.16)	51.7 (2.04)	53.2 (2.09)	103.4 (4.07)	763 (30.05)
Source: National Meteorology and Hydrology Service of Peru

== Transportation ==
The city is connected to the city of Huancavelica by a 2-lane road that was paved in 2016.

== Education ==
The town is home of a local university; the Universidad para el Desarrollo Andino, and has a branch of the Universidad Nacional de Huancavelica. There are a local technical institute; the Instituto Tecnologico Lircay.

== Health ==
Lircay has a clinic, Centro de Salud, that serves the city and the towns nearby.
