= Battle of Ayacucho order of battle =

The order of battle for the Battle of Ayacucho proceeded as follows:

== See also ==
Battle of Ayacucho
