= Angaraes province =

Coordinates: 12.989658°S 74.720489°W

Angaraes
- Province
- Location of Angaraes in the Huancavelica Region
- Country: Peru
- Region: Huancavelica
- Capital: Lircay

Government
  - Mayor: Raul Victor Anyaipoma Bendezu (2007)

Area
  - Total: 1,959.03 km^{2} (756.39 sq mi)

Population
  - Total: 51,931 (2,005 census)
  - Density: 26.509/km^{2} (68.657/sq mi)
- UBIGEO: 0903

Angaraes is one of seven provinces located in the Huancavelica Region of Peru. The capital of this province is the city of Lircay.

== Boundaries ==
- North: province of Acobamba
- East: Ayacucho Region
- South: province of Huaytará
- West: province of Huancavelica

== Political division ==
The province is divided into twelve districts, which are:

- Anchonga (Anchonga)
- Callanmarca (Callanmarca)
- Ccochaccasa (Ccochaccasa)
- Chincho (Chincho)
- Congalla (Congalla)
- Huanca-Huanca (Huanca-Huanca)
- Huayllay Grande (Huayllay Grande)
- Julcamarca (Julcamarca)
- Lircay (Lircay)
- San Antonio de Antaparco (Antaparco)
- Santo Tomás de Pata (Santo Tomás de Pata)
- Secclla (Secclla)

== Ethnic groups ==
The people in the province are mainly Indigenous citizens of Quechua descent. Quechua is the language which the majority of the population (78.63%) learnt to speak in childhood, 21.12% of the residents started speaking using the Spanish language (2007 Peru Census).

== See also ==
- Hatun Rit'i
- Kachimayu
- Puka Q'asa
- Qiwllaqucha
- Wayra Q'asa
- Yana Chuku
