= Martín Zurbano =

Spanish guerilla leader and martyr (1788-1845)

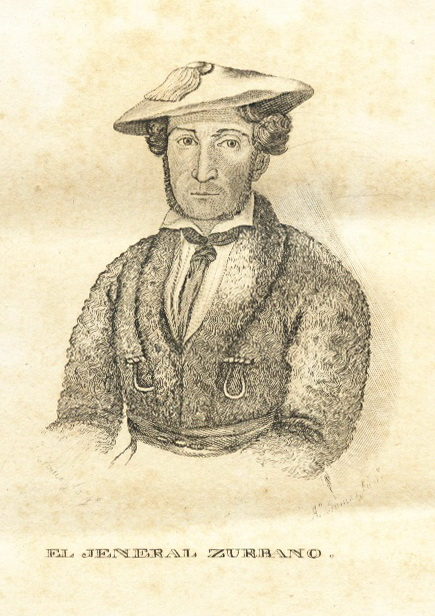
Martín Zurbano

Martín Zurbano Baras (February 29, 1788 – January 21, 1845) was a Spanish military figure. A guerrilla leader, he is considered a "martyr to Spanish liberty".

Born in Varea, La Rioja, the youngest of four siblings, he fought in the War of Spanish Independence as a guerrilla. With future generals like Francisco Espoz y Mina, he defended the Constitution of 1812, and helped create the province of Logroño.

He then fought in First Carlist War on the Liberal (Isabeline) side and rose to the rank of field marshal. A British article written in 1840 describes his role in this war: "In time of peace a contrabandista, or smuggler, he soon after the commencement of the war sought and obtained permission to raise a body of men to act in conjunction with the queen's troops against the Carlists. His standard, once displayed, was resorted to by smugglers, robbers, and outcasts of all descriptions, attracted by the prospect of plunder and adventure. These were increased by deserters..."

Zurbano commanded the force known as the Compañía de Tiradores de Alava (founded 1833), which had been joined with the Partida de Contra aduaneros (Anti-aduanero Party), and was known as the Partida de la Muerte (Party of Death). By 1836, the force was known as Batallón de Voluntarios de la Rioja Alavesa and was disbanded in 1840.

He was an ardent follower of Baldomero Espartero, who named him military governor of Girona and commander general of Biscay in 1840. Zurbano participated in the bombardment of Barcelona in 1843.

Zurbano suppressed the moderado faction in Biscay in 1841, and fought against Juan Prim in Catalonia (1843).

He fled to Portugal after the fall of Espartero, but Isabel II granted him a pardon. In 1844, he led a revolt with 80 men who advocated the adoption of the Constitution of 1837 (Grito de Nájera) and the return of Espartero. It included the support of key generals, including Juan Prim. Zurbano was imprisoned by Ramón María Narváez.

He was arrested and executed by firing squad, along with his sons Benito and Feliciano, by order of Narváez.

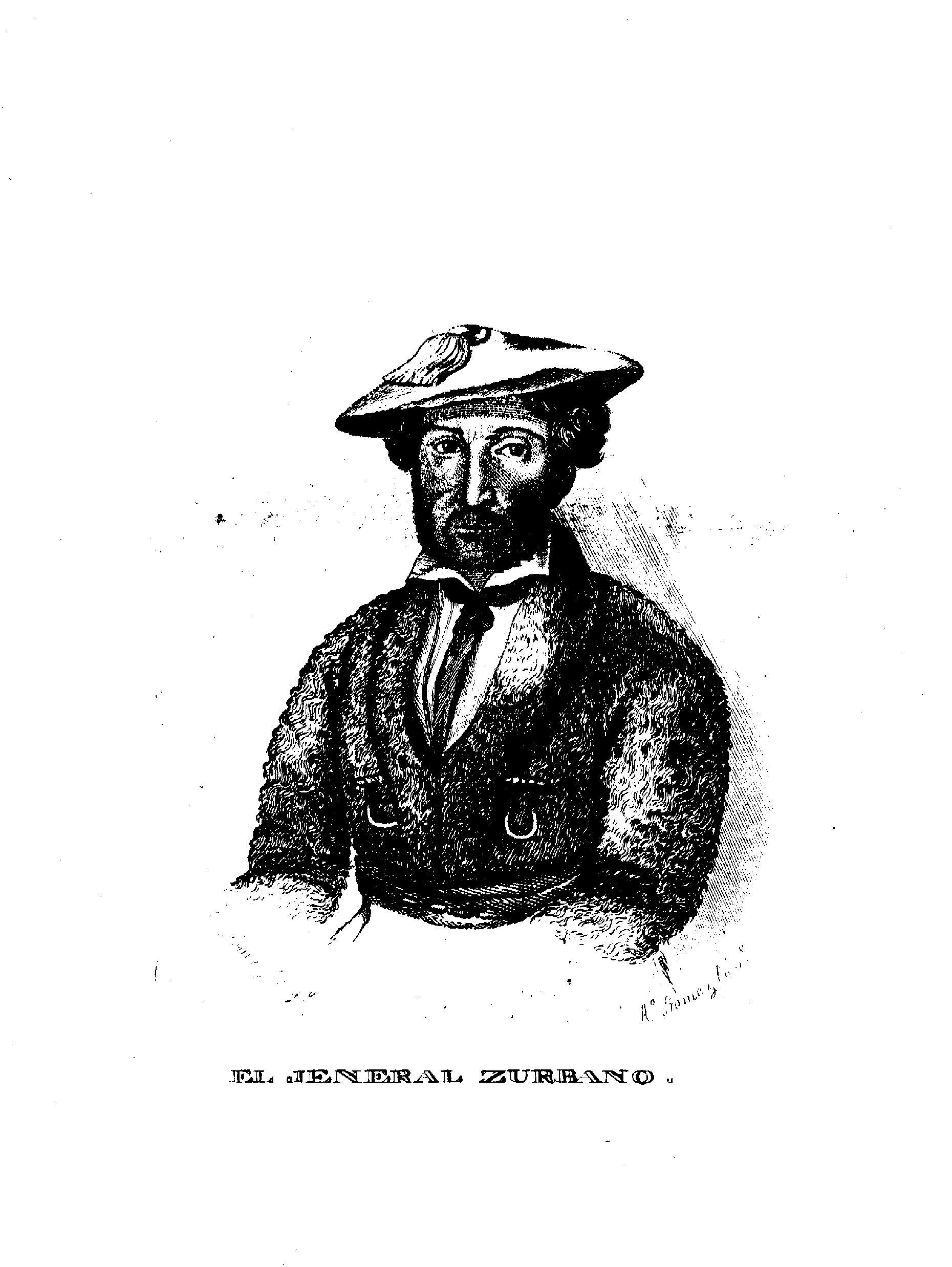
Zurbano

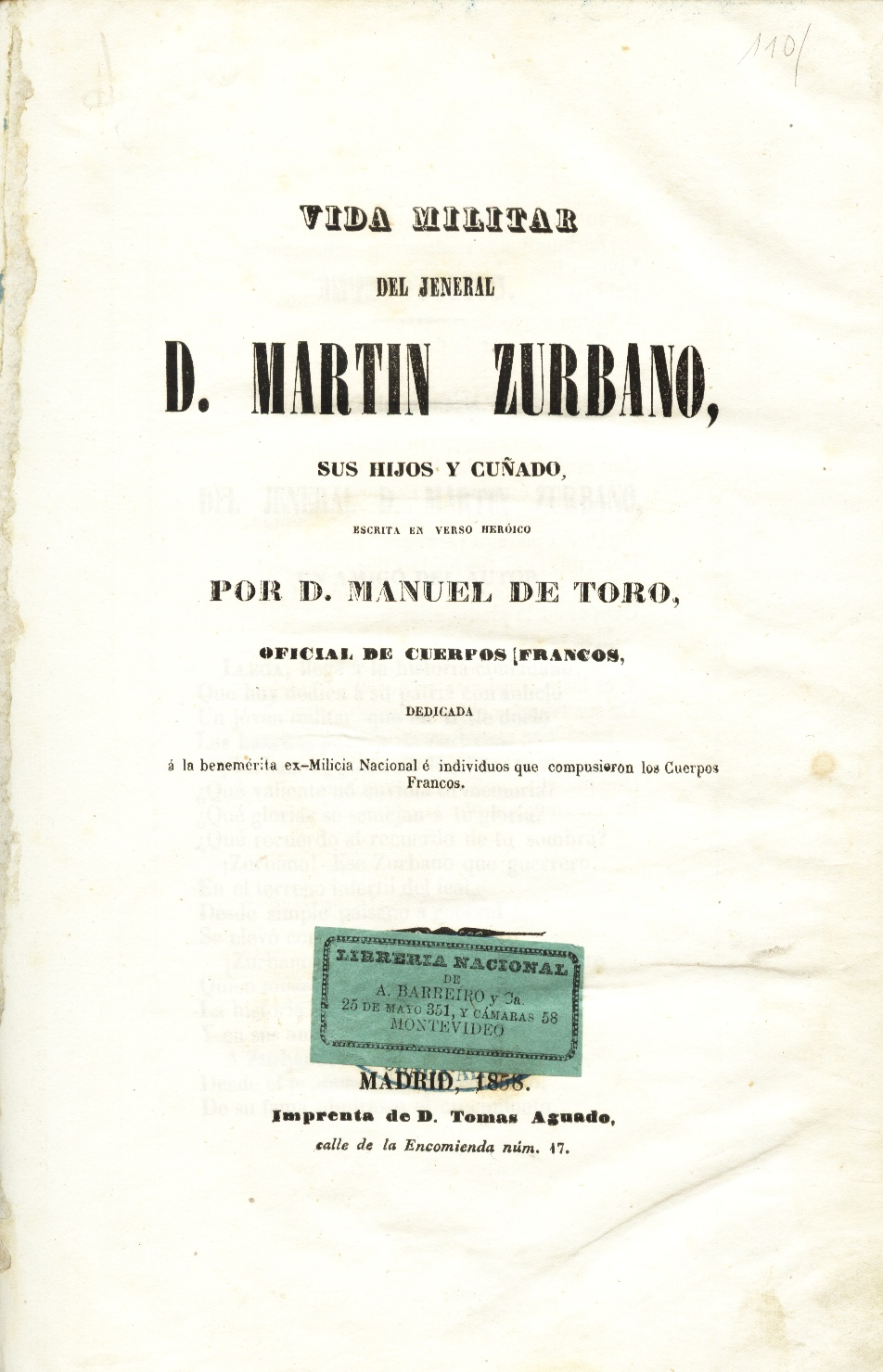
Cover of a 19th-century book about Zurbano

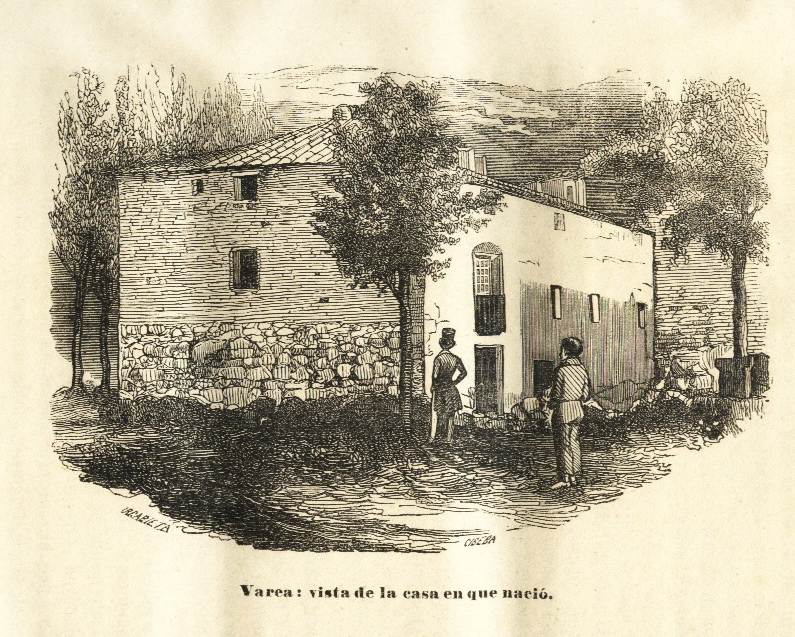
Birthplace of Zurbano
