= Radal Siete Tazas National Park =

National park in the Maule Region, Chile

Coordinates: 35.4588°S 71.0306°W

- IUCN category II (national park)
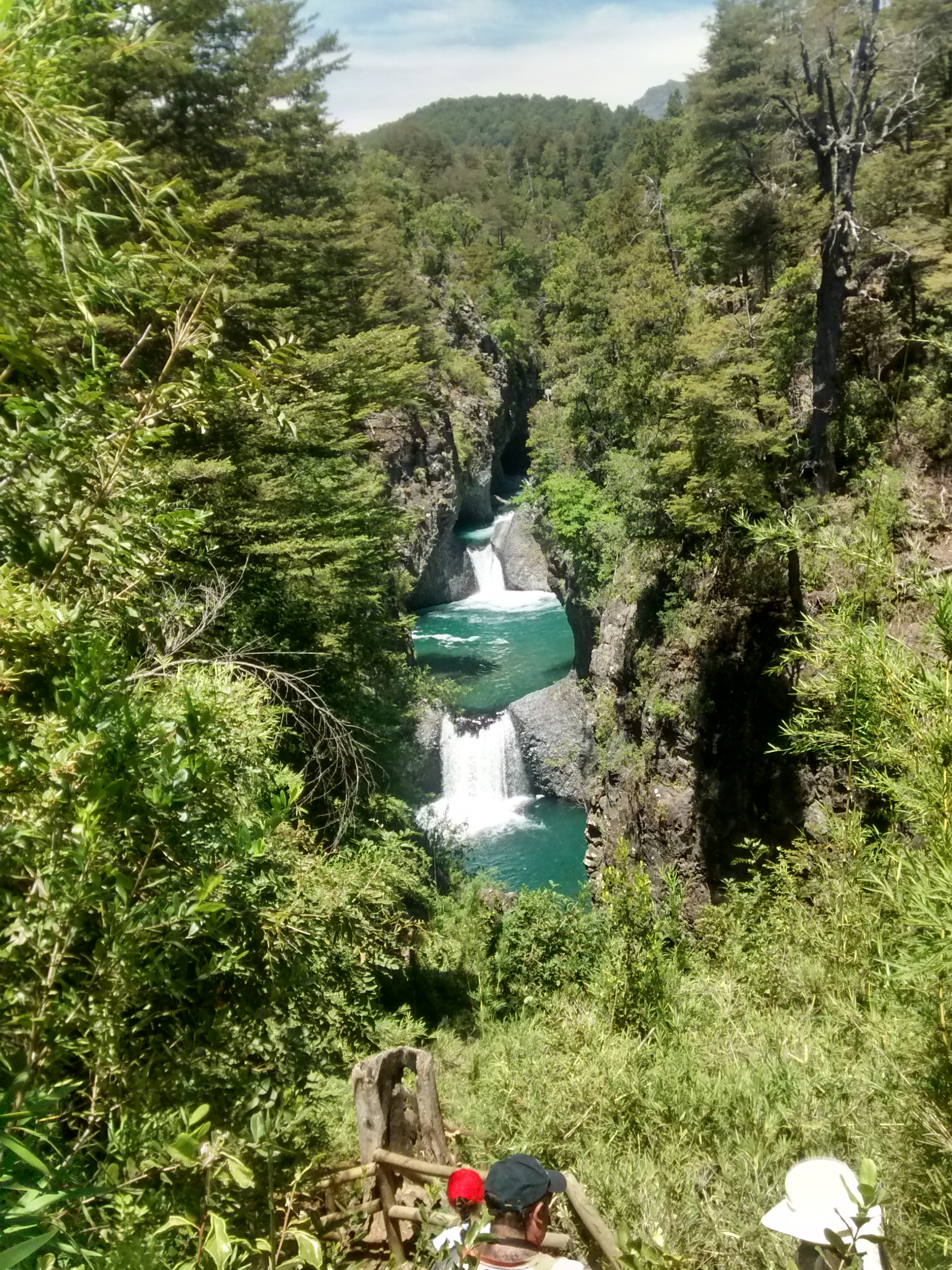
- The Seven Cups
- Interactive map of Radal Siete Tazas National Park
- Location: Maule Region, Chile
- Nearest city: Molina
- Area: 41.4 km^{2} (10,200 acres)
- Governing body: Corporación Nacional Forestal

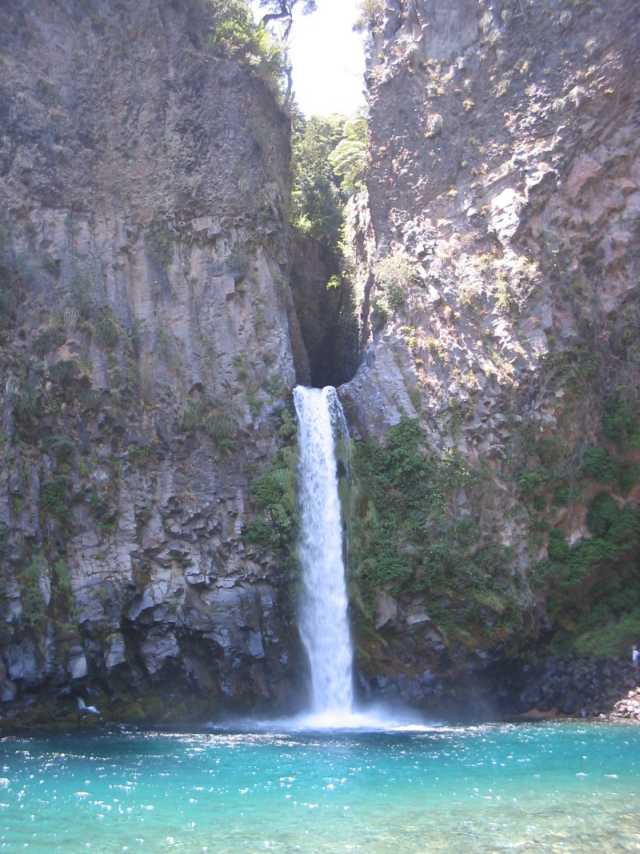
Waterfall Salto de la Leona.

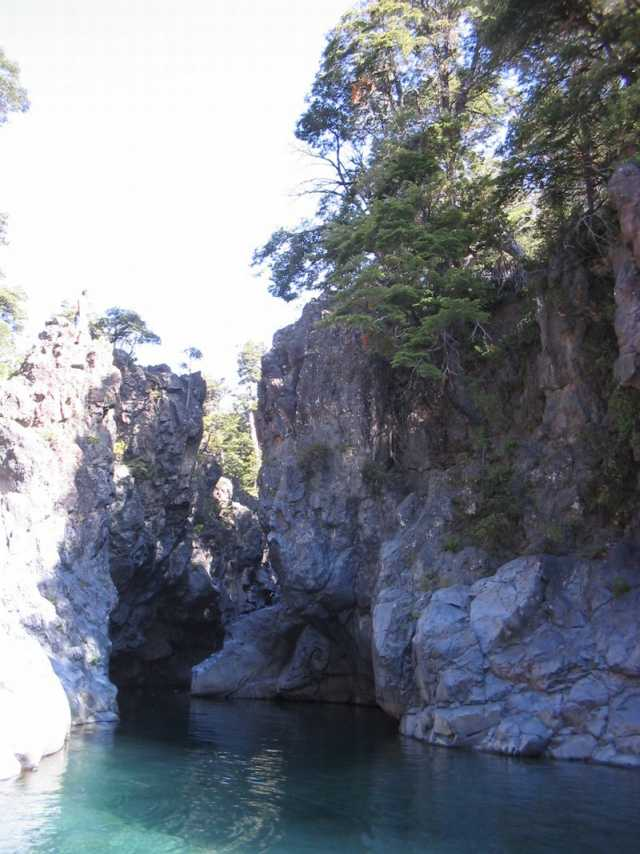
Pools along the river Claro.

Radal Siete Tazas National Park (Spanish pronunciation: [raˈðal ˈsjete ˈtasas]) is a national park in Curicó Province, Maule Region, Chile. It lies in a pre-Andean area close to Descabezado Grande volcano.

== History ==
This protected area was reclassified as a national park in 2008.

After the February 27, 2010 earthquake one of the park's main attraction, the Seven Cups, completely dried up. It is believed a rock fissure allowed the water to empty into an aquifer.

== Geography ==
The park's most popular feature is the area known as Siete Tazas (Seven Cups), which consists of seven consecutive natural pools with their respective waterfalls along Claro River. These waterfalls range from 1 to 10.5 metres. There are also two high waterfalls called El Velo de Novia (The Bridal Veil) and La Leona (The Lioness), with single vertical drops of 40 and 20 metres respectively. Many kayakers paddle the smaller falls ranging from 1 to 10.5 metres (3–32 feet). Once kayakers enter the steep canyon the only way out is down. Many tourists congregate on platforms surrounding the canyon to watch the kayakers as they navigate the waterfalls. At the end of the run kayakers must make a quick move to shore in order to avoid the 40 meter waterfall. This is the end of the canyon where kayakers then hike out.

The park's elevations range from 650 m (2,130 ft) to 2,600 m (8,500 ft).

== Biology ==
The park protects tree species mainly of the genus Nothofagus, including the threatened Nothofagus glauca and Nothofagus × leoni, as well as Nothofagus macrocarpa, Nothofagus dombeyi, Nothofagus antarctica, and Nothofagus alpina. Also it is possible to find vulnerable and rare species, as are Austrocedrus chilensis and Maytenus chubutensis.

The park is home to an endangered subspecies of the burrowing parrot (Cyanoliseus patagonus) known locally as Tricahue.
