= Claro River (Maule) =

Coordinates: 35.4625°S 71.8842°W

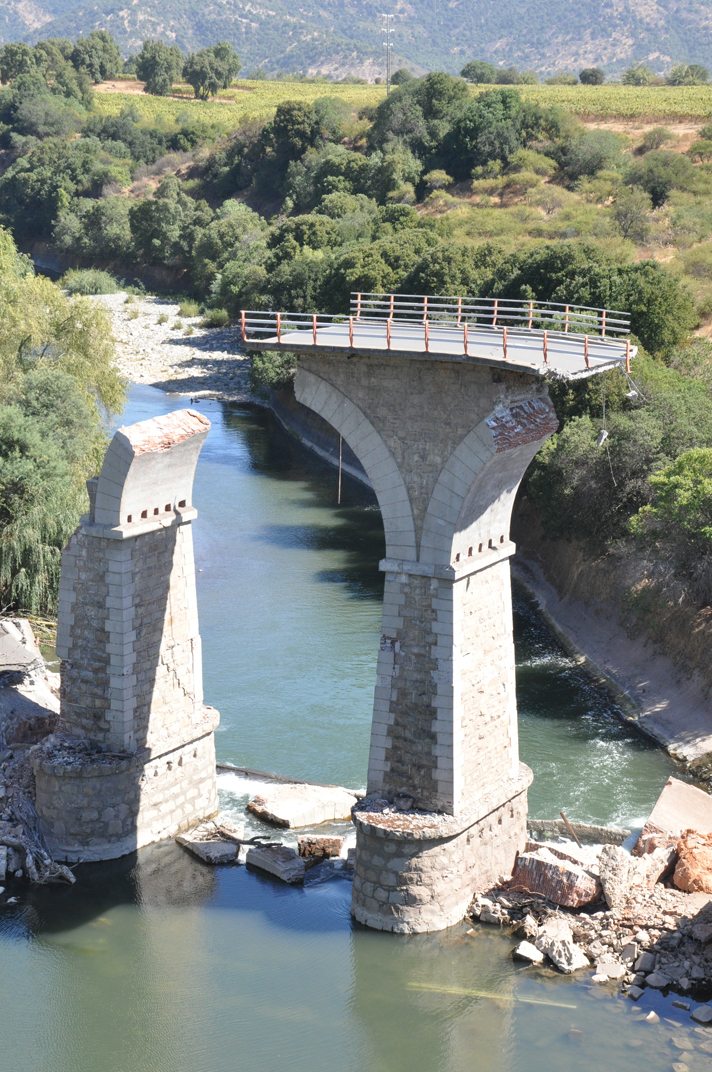
- Total damage of the Chile Highway 5 bridge (southwards) over the Claro River as consequence of the 2010 Chile earthquake

Location
- Country: Chile

Physical characteristics
- Discharge
  - average: Maule River

The Claro River is a river of Chile located in the Maule Region. It rises in the Andes, in the Radal Siete Tazas National Park and flows northwest until the city of Molina. Then, it flows southwest, crosses below the Panamericana, to the vicinity of the city of Talca to empty into the Maule River. In this last portion of its course, the river receives the waters of the tributary Lircay River.

The invasive plant species Limnobium laevigatum is present in the river.

== See also ==
- List of rivers of Chile
