= Lircay River =

Coordinates: 35.37929°S 71.64834°W

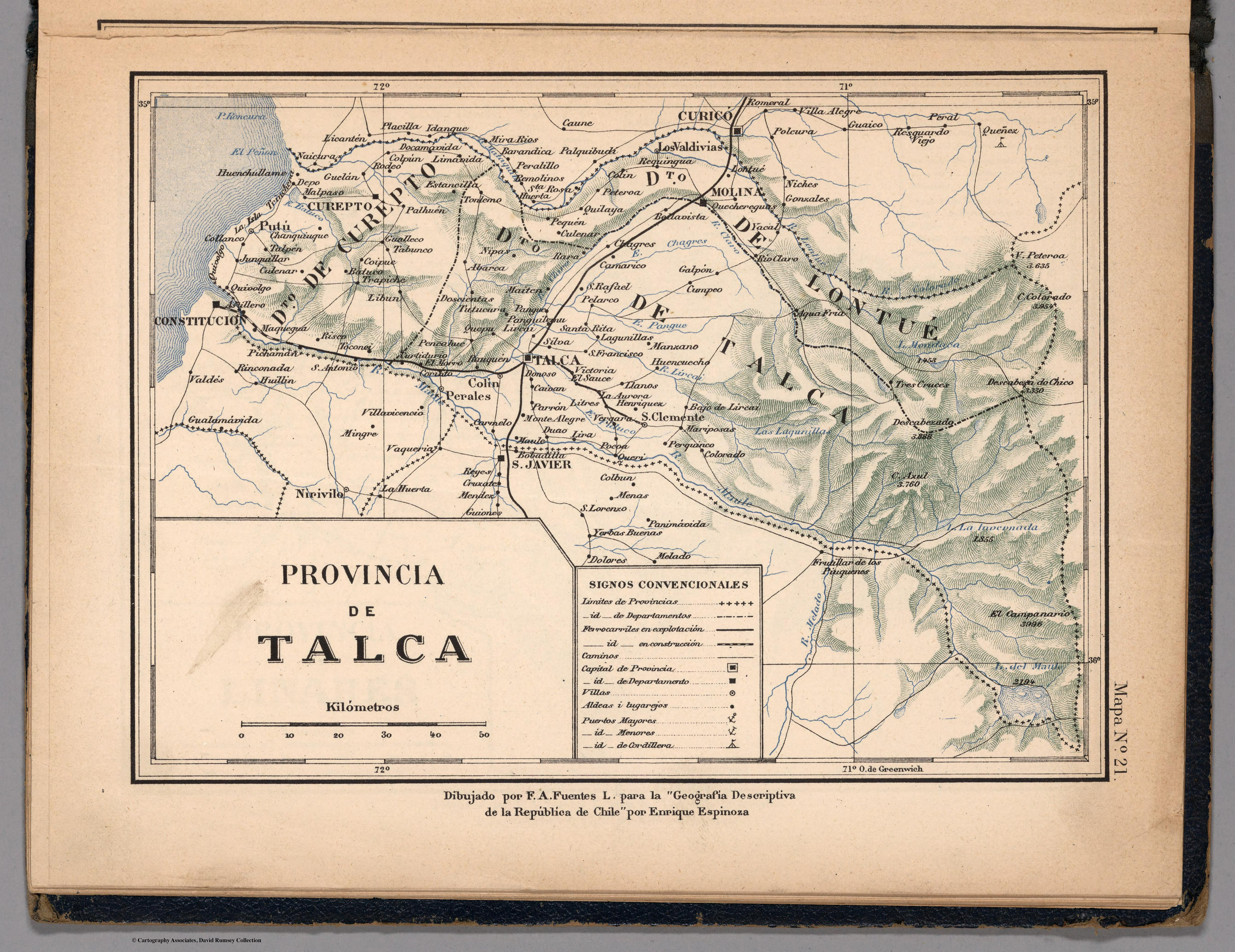
- Lircay (Lircai) River, north of Talca

Location
- Country: Chile

Physical characteristics
- Mouth
  - elevation: 89 m (292 ft)

The Lircay River is a tributary of the Claro River, near the city of Talca in Chile. It is not to be confused with the Lircay River of Linares.

== See also ==
- List of rivers of Chile
