= Kachimayu (Ayacucho-Huancavelica) =

- Etymology: Quechua

Location
- Country: Peru
- Region: Ayacucho Region, Huancavelica Region

Physical characteristics
- Mouth: Mantaro River

The Kachimayu (Quechua kachi salt, mayu river, "salt river", hispanicized spellings Cachimayo or Cachi) is a river in Peru located in the regions Ayacucho and Huancavelica. It is an affluent of the Mantaro River.

Kachimayu originates in the Huamanga Province. It flows along the border of the provinces Angaraes and Huamanga until reaching the Huanta Province. Then it turns north, following the border of the provinces Angaraes and Huanta. East of Marcas, the Urubamba joins Kachimayu. The confluence with the Mantaro River is near Tinkuy (Tincoy) and Allqumach'ay (Alcomachay).

== See also ==
- Pampaqucha
