= Hatun Rit'i =

Mountain in Peru

- Location within Peru

Highest point
- Elevation: 4,800 m (15,700 ft)
- Coordinates: 13°06′08″S 74°44′00″W

Geography
- Location: Peru, Huancavelica Region
- Parent range: Andes

Hatun Rit'i (Quechua hatun big, rit'i snow, "big snow (mountain)", Hispanicized spelling Jatunrite) is a mountain in the Andes of Peru, about 4,800 metres (15,748 ft) high. It lies in the Huancavelica Region, Angaraes Province, Lircay District.
