= Crown of Simón Bolívar =

Civic crown of Simón Bolívar

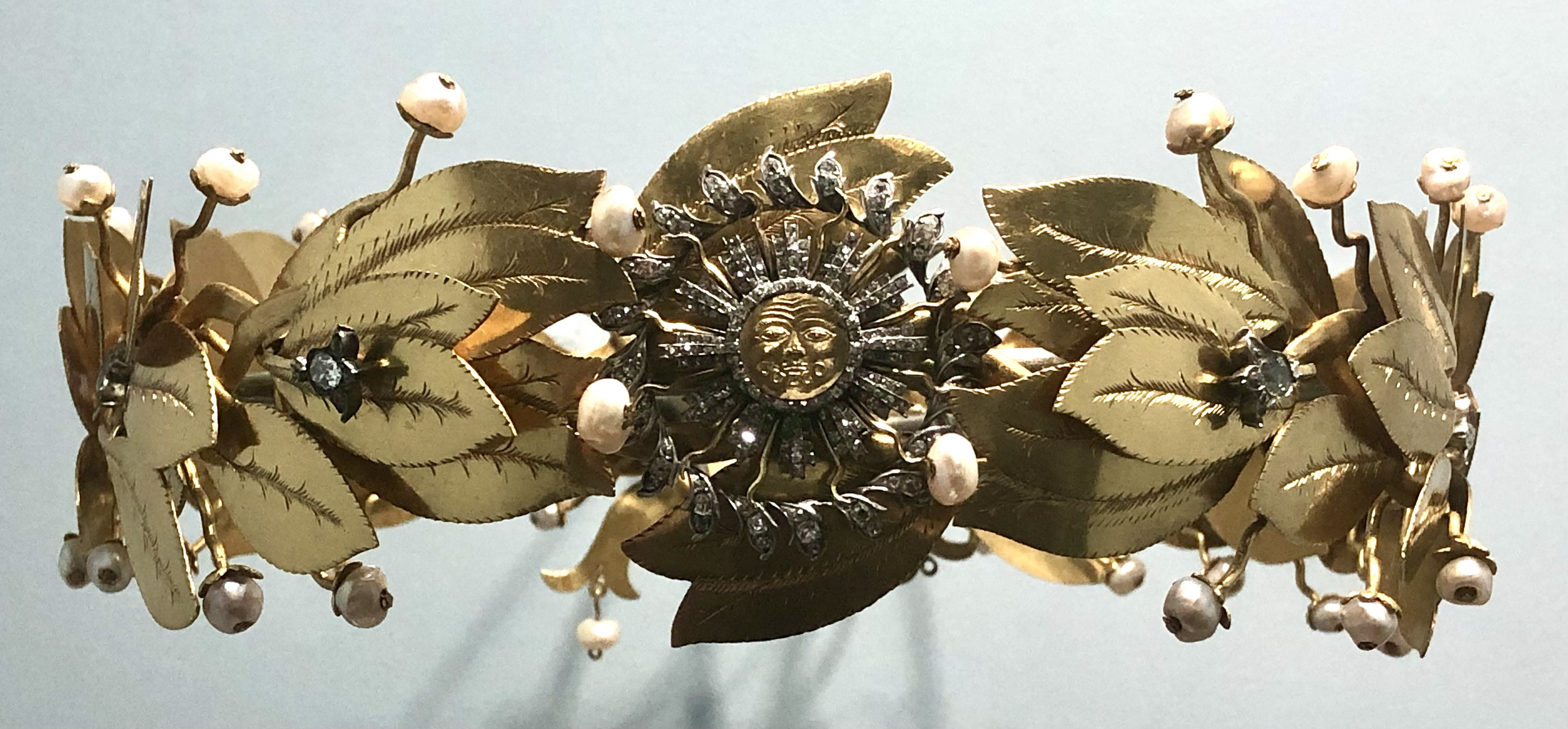
- Bolívar's corolla at the National Museum of Colombia

Details
- Country: Peru; Colombia
- Made: c. 1825
- Owner: Government of Colombia
- Weight: 762 grams (26.9 ounces)
- Material: Gold
- Notable stones: Baroque pearls & diamonds

The Crown of Simón Bolívar is a civic crown, or corolla, presented to Simón Bolívar by the people of Cusco in 1825. The crown is exhibited and preserved in the permanent collection of the National Museum of Colombia in Bogotá.

== History ==
Upon entering the city of Cusco in 1825 Simon Bolivar was presented by Francisca Zubiaga y Bernales with a gold corolla after having defeated the Royalists in the Battle of Ayacucho.

Bolívar declined the crown and instead proclaimed that it rightfully belonged to Antonio José de Sucre who also declined its ownership and, by choice, sent it to the Congress of Colombia which accepted it under legislative authority for the newly established national museum.

In 1860, during the 1860-1862 Colombia Civil War, the crown was stolen from the National Museum of Colombia by supporters of the liberalist José María Obando. The crown was missing one of its baroque pearls when returned to the government.

In 1889, the crown was initially placed in the vaults of the Banco Nacional, the then central bank of the United States of Colombia. Later that year, it was moved to the presidential residence where it remained in an iron safe until 1938 when it was once again re-located but this time to the vaults of the Bank of the Republic, the newly established central bank of the Republic of Colombia.

On 9 April 1948, during the Bogotazo riots, the crown was safely removed by Teresa Cuervo Borda wrapped in newspaper and transported via taxi away from the resulting chaos which left much of downtown Bogotá destroyed.

Since June 2017, the crown has been on display at the National Museum of Colombia in a specially designed vault along with other works of jewelry belonging to the Colombian Institute of Anthropology and History.

== Composition ==
The crown, which measures 7.5 x 22 cm and weighs about 762 grams, is adorned with 47 gold laurel leaves which give it the appearance of a laurel wreath, itself a symbol of triumph in Ancient Greece and Ancient Rome. The crown is adorned with 49 baroque pearls, 9 diamonds, 274 diamond sparkles, and 10 gold beads.

The making of the crown is attributed to Native American goldsmith Chungapoma.

== See also ==
- Crown of José María Córdova
