= Crown of José María Córdova =

Civic crown of José María Córdova

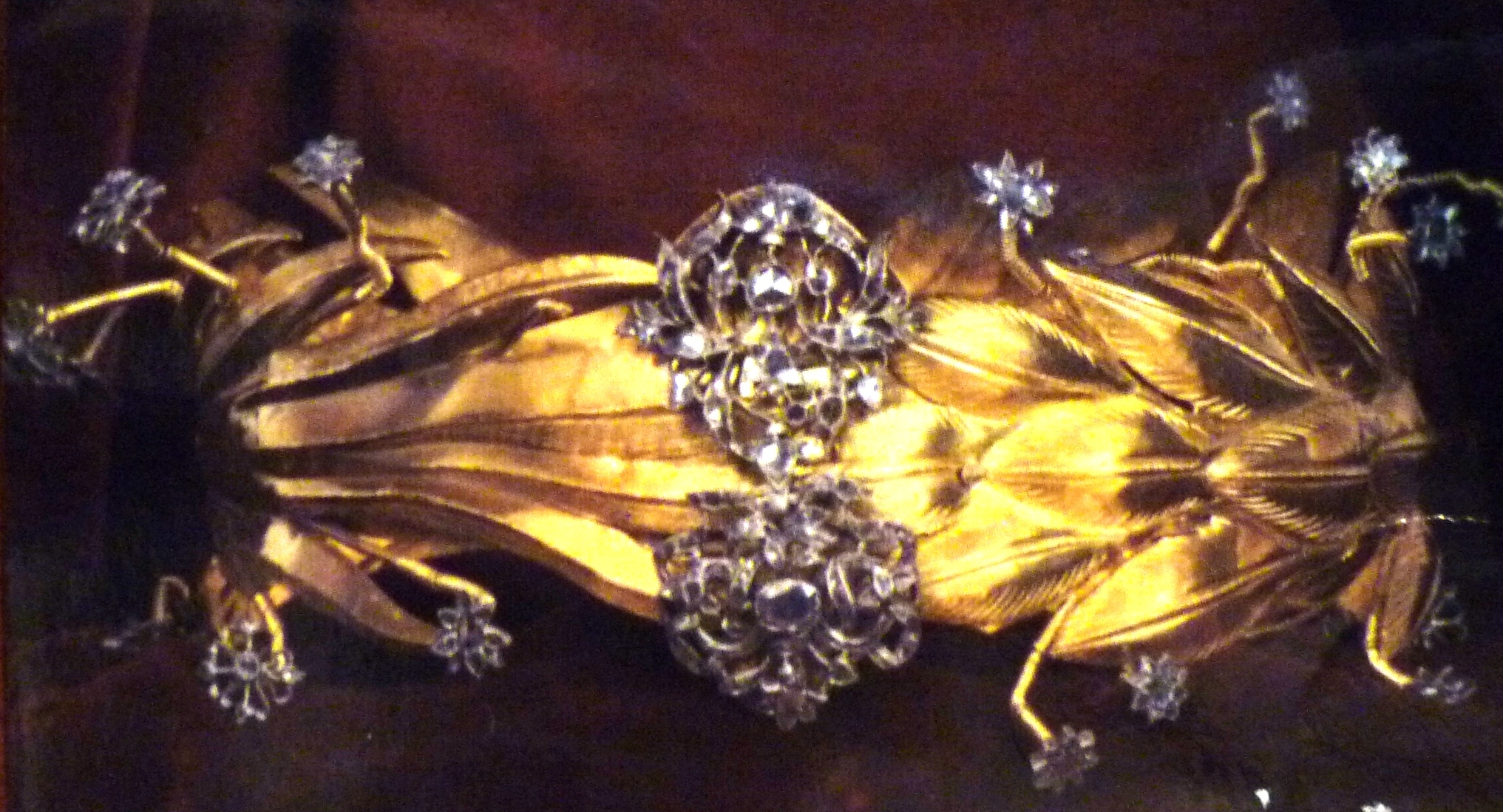
- Córdova's corolla at the Museum of Religious Art in Rionegro

Details
- Country: Bolivia (Upper Peru); Colombia
- Made: c. 1825
- Owner: City of Rionegro
- Weight: 554 grams (19.5 ounces)
- Material: Gold
- Notable stones: Diamonds

The Crown of José María Córdova is a civic crown, or corolla, presented to Simón Bolívar by the people of La Paz in 1825. The crown is exhibited and preserved in the collection of the Arts Museum of Rionegro.

== History ==
After the Battle of Ayacucho in 1824, and crossing into Upper Peru in 1825, Simón Bolívar was recognized by the people of La Paz with a gold corolla symbolizing a new era after the defeat of the Royalists.

Bolívar declined the crown and instead proclaimed that it rightfully belonged to Antonio José de Sucre who also declined its ownership and, by choice, gifted it to José María Córdova claiming that it was him who had emboldened the Patriots in combat.

Córdova, who had accepted the crown from Bolívar and Sucre, gifted the crown to the City of Santiago de Arma Rionegro on 10 September of 1825 and sent it with captain Nicolás Caicedo who arrived at Rionegro in January of 1826 after transversing over 4,500 kilometers from La Paz.

For over 58 years, the crown was passed along various distinguished families and individuals of Rionegro until 1883 when the Banco Oriente was founded and the crown was moved there for safekeeping and exhibition. After Banco Santander had acquired Banco Oriente in 1999, the crown was saved from being transported from the city after the director of the Museum of Religious Art raised concern that the crown along with other objects belonging to Rionegro were being packed for transportation. The crown, along with the other objects, were handed over to public officials and the crown passed to the Museum of Religious Art for exhibition and preservation.

On 18 December 2019, after over 20 years of being exhibited at the Museum of Religious Art, the crown was relocated to the Arts Museum of Rionegro to be permanently exhibited in a specially designed display that guarantees its safekeeping.

Since its arrival in January of 1826, the crown left Rionegro for the first on 20 July 2024 to be exhibited during the independence day celebrations in the city of Concepción along with other objects which belonged to José María Córdova. The crown is currently a subject of dispute as the city of Concepción, also in the Antioquia Department, claims its ownership as the rightful birthplace of Antonio José de Sucre.

== Composition ==
The crown, which weighs about 554 grams, consists of a central belt that is 23 millimeters wide and one millimeter thick. One half of the crown is adorned with 24 gold laurel leaves and, the other, with 13 gold palm leaves representing both a laurel wreath and the Martyrs Palm. The crown is decorated with 20 gold coiled threads, seven silver florets, five diamonds, and around 200 diamond sparkles.

== See also ==
- Crown of Simón Bolívar
