= José Faustino Sánchez Carrión =

Venezuelan pro-independence politician (1787 - 1825)

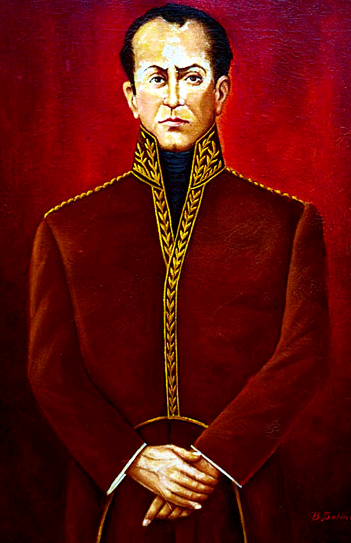
José Faustino Sánchez Carrión, the "Tribune of the Peruvian Republic" (Spanish: “Tribuno de la República Peruana”).

José Faustino Sánchez Carrión (Huamachuco, Trujillo, February 13, 1787 – Lurín, Lima, June 2, 1825) was a pro-independence politician from Peru. Also known as the "Solitario de Sayán" (English: "Solitary man from Sayán"), he had a decisive role in the establishment of the republican system of government in post-independence Peru. He was one of the writers of the first political constitution of Peru, of liberal tendencies. He later participated in the diplomatic mission which traveled to Guayaquil to invite Simón Bolívar to Peru. He died prematurely, victim of an unknown sickness.

Sánchez Carrión served as Bolívar's secretary or general minister, accompanying him throughout his victorious campaign on Peruvian soil and acquiring the necessary resources needed by the United Liberating Army (composed by the Expedición Libertadora del Perú, Gran Colombia, and the Republic of Peru) which emerged victorious in the battles of Junin and Ayacucho. He was Minister of Finance of Peru from April 1824 to October 1824. Afterwards, he served from 1824 to 1825 as Peru's Minister of Government and Foreign Relations, and as such signed the invitations written by Simón Bolívar for the American nation's attendance to the Congress of Panama.

== See also ==
- Peruvian War of Independence
