= Casa del Oidor =

Historical building in Peru

Coordinates: 12°02′45″S 77°01′46″W

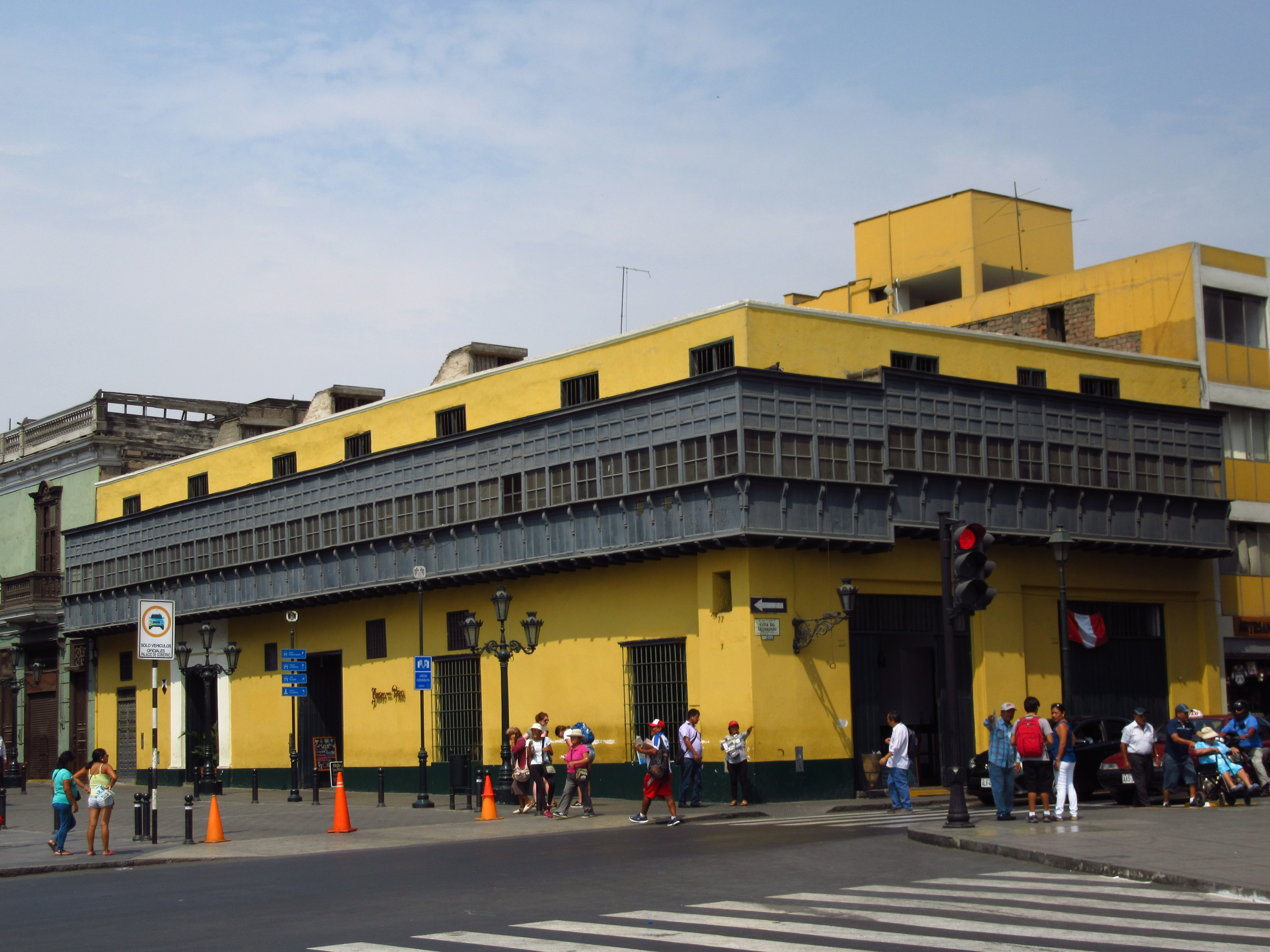
- Interactive map of the Casa del Oidor area

General information
- Architectural style: Spanish Colonial
- Year built: 16th/17th century

Technical details
- Floor count: 2

The Casa del Oidor is a historical building located next to the Plaza Mayor, in the historic centre of Lima, Peru. It is best known for the large balcony that runs through its façade. It is part of the Cultural heritage of Peru.

== History ==
The single-story house was built on two of the four plots that made up one of the 117 blocks into which viceregal Lima was divided after the Spanish founding at the hands of Francisco Pizarro.

The person in charge of the works was Alonso Riquelme, treasurer of the Spanish conquistadors. His first guest was Gaspar Melchor de Carbajal, attorney general of Indians and chief bailiff of slaughterhouses and markets of the city, who was in charge of hearing neighbourhood complaints; It is from this function of its owner that the house was called "of the Oidor."

The house, like many other buildings, was rebuilt after the earthquake of October 28, 1746.

Another important event in the house was the ovation that the people of Lima gave to General José de San Martín when he appeared on his balcony, after proclaiming the independence of Peru in 1821.

== See also ==
- Plaza Mayor, Lima
- Government Palace, Peru
- Archbishop's Palace of Lima
