= Congress of Panama =

1826 convention of Latin American republics

Nations of the Congress of Panama (right), 1826

The Congress of Panama (also referred to as the Amphictyonic Congress, in homage to the Amphictyonic League of Ancient Greece) was a congress organized by Simón Bolívar in 1826 with the goal of bringing together the new republics of Hispanic America to develop a unified policy towards the Spanish Empire and Holly Alliance. Although they were invited, neither Brazil nor the United States were part of this diplomatic alliance. Held in Panama City from 22 June to 15 July, it proposed creating a league of republics with a common military and diplomatic policy, a mutual defense pact, and a project to liberate Cuba and Puerto Rico, but never the formation of a unitary state.

== Representatives ==
The congress of Panama was called by Simón Bolívar from Lima on December 7, 1824, and José Faustino Sánchez Carrión, Minister of Government and Foreign Relations of Peru, who fully shared with Bolívarian ideal of Hispanic-American unity, sent the invitation to the American governments.

It was attended by representatives of Gran Colombia (comprising the modern-day nations of Colombia, Ecuador, Panama, and Venezuela), Peru, the United Provinces of Central America (Guatemala, El Salvador, Honduras, Nicaragua, and Costa Rica), and Mexico. Chile and the United Provinces of South America (Argentina) declined to attend, out of mistrust of Bolívar's enormous influence. The Empire of Brazil did not send delegates, because it expected a hostile reception from its Hispanic neighbours due to its ongoing war with Argentina over modern Uruguay. The isolationist Paraguay (which refused previous delegates from Bolívar) was not invited.

== British observer ==
Simón Bolívar also agreed to invite two European countries as observers, because of the commercial interests they had in Hispanic America: the United Kingdom and the Netherlands. The invitation to the British government sought to stimulate assistance from Argentina and Chile, which had their main trading partner in that country. The United Kingdom accepted the proposal and sent an observer, Edward James Dawkins, but with precise orders from Minister George Canning: limit themselves to seeking trade agreements and dissuade Greater Colombia and Mexico from supporting expeditions to the islands of Cuba or Puerto Rico to make them independent of Spain.

== Dutch observer ==
The observer for the Netherlands, Jan van Veer, was sent to propose Dutch mediation between the Hispanic American republics and Spain, but he did not have the necessary accreditation. Added to this was that the Dutch monarchy had not recognized the independence of any Hispanic-American republics, which is why the Dutch delegate was received only as an individual.

== Results ==
The grandly titled "Treaty of Union, League, and Perpetual Confederation" that emerged from the congress was ultimately ratified only by Gran Colombia, and Bolívar's dream soon foundered irretrievably with civil war in that nation, the disintegration of Central America, and the emergence of nationalism. The Congress of Panama also had political ramifications in the United States. President John Quincy Adams and Secretary of State Henry Clay wanted the US to attend the congress, to which they had only been invited due to pressure on Bolívar. Since US. political designs on the islands of Cuba and Puerto Rico and Hispanic America had mostly outlawed slavery, politicians from the Southern United States held up the mission by not approving funds or confirming the delegates. Despite their eventual departure, one of the two US delegates, Richard C. Anderson Jr., died en route to Panama; and the other, John Sergeant, arrived only after the Congress had concluded its discussions.

The United Kingdom managed to acquire many favorable trade deals with Hispanic American countries at the Congress.

== See also ==
- José Faustino Sánchez Carrión
- Latin American integration
- Pan-Americanism

== Bibliography ==
- Reza, Germán A. "Was France Invited to the Amphictyonic Congress of Panama in 1826? Evidence at the Margins of an International Controversy." Critical History 72 (2019): 27-44. online
- Sanders, Ralph. "Congressional Reaction in the United States to the Panama Congress of 1826." The Americas (1954): 141-154. online
- Germán A. de la Reza, El Congreso de Panamá de 1826 y otros ensayos de integración en el siglo XIX. Estudio y fuentes documentales anotadas, UAM-Eon, México, 2006. ISBN 970-31-0656-0.
