= Corolla (headgear) =

Ancient headdress in the form of a small circlet or crown

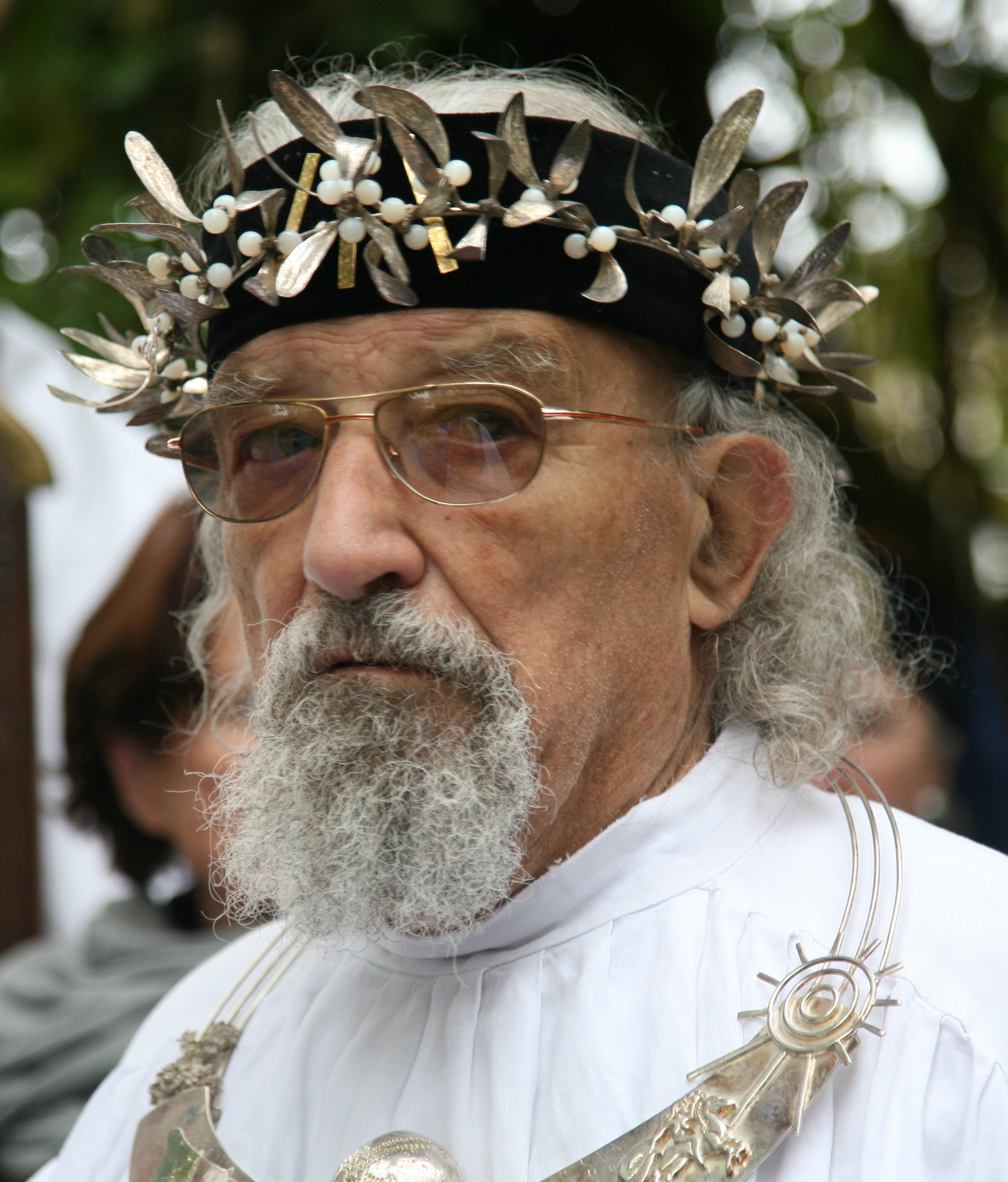
A corolla, simulating a chaplet of mistletoe, as worn by a grand druid of the Breton Gorsedd

A corolla is an ancient headdress in the form of a small circlet or crown. Usually it has ceremonial significance and represents victory or authority.

== History ==
The term corolla and/or corollæ appears in a chapter title in Pliny the Elder's Naturalis Historia: "Who invented the art of making garlands: When they first received the name of 'corollæ,' and for what reason."

In ancient times, chaplets made from branches and twigs of trees were worn by victors in sacred contests: According to Pliny, P. Claudius Pulcher introduced winter chaplets for the time at which flowers and plant matter are not available, made of thin laminæ of horn stained various colors.

These winter chaplets were known there as "corollæ" (the diminutive of corona, a crown), a name Pliny says was given them to express the "remarkable delicacy of their texture".

Later, these head dresses were made of thin plates of copper, gilt or silvered, and were called "corollaria", as introduced by Crassus Dives as a way to confer a greater honor when receiving them.

== See also ==
- Coronet
- Diadem
- Polos
