= Francisca Zubiaga y Bernales =

First Lady of Peru

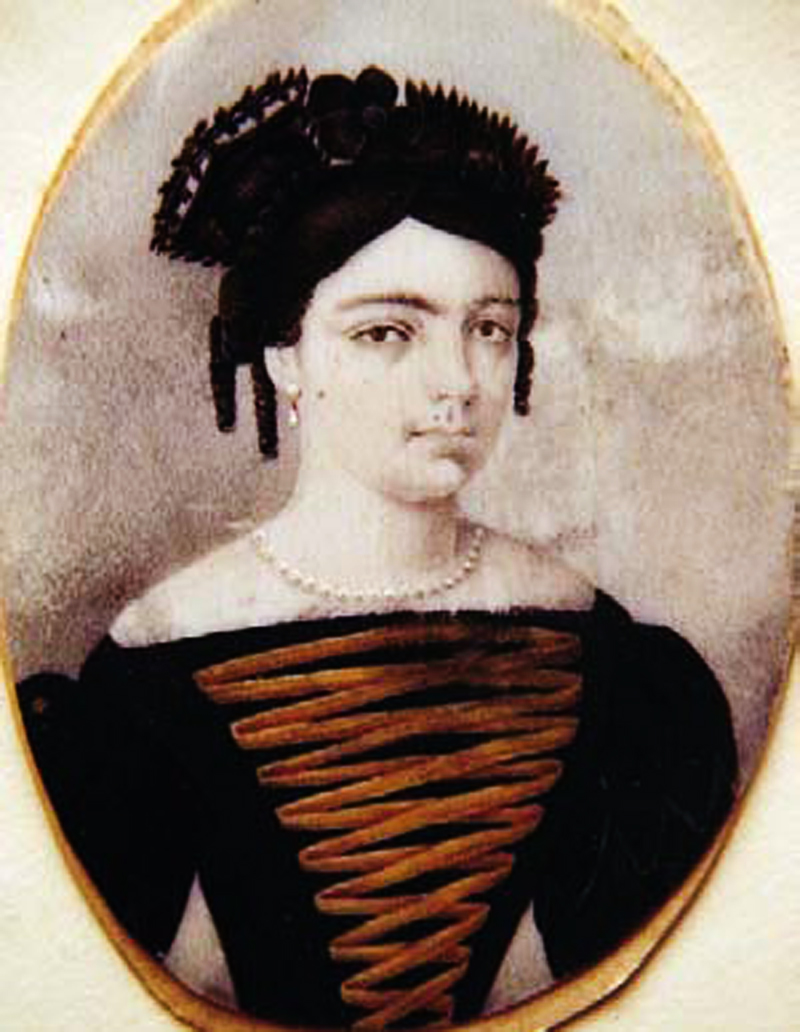

First Lady of Peru
- In office September 1, 1829 – December 20, 1833
- President: Agustín Gamarra
- Preceded by: Micaela de Echevarría
- Succeeded by: María Josefa Pinillos y Cacho

Personal details
- Born: 1803 Cusco, Viceroyalty of Peru
- Died: 1835 (aged 31–32) Valparaíso, Chile

Francisca Zubiaga y Bernales (1803–1835) was a Peruvian soldier, stateswoman, and socialite. She served as the first lady of Peru while her husband, Agustín Gamarra, served as President from 1829 to 1833. She was known by her nicknames of "La Mariscala," "Doña Pancha," and "La Presidenta."

== Biography ==
Francisca Zubiaga y Bernales was born in Cusco on September 11th, 1803 in what was then the Spanish Viceroyalty of Peru to a Spanish father and a mother from Cusco. The eldest among four siblings, she was educated at a convent. From a young age she was regarded as having a brave personality with a rebellious streak. In the Basque language, 'Zubiaga' means: "Close to the bridge."

In 1824, she married the Patriot soldier Agustín Gamarra, who would go on to distinguish himself in the Battle of Ayacucho, and would be named Prefect of Cusco and Chief of the Southern Army. He eventually received the title of Mariscal (Field Marshall), from which Zubiaga's nickname "La Mariscala", meaning the female field marshall, emerged.

During Simón Bolivar's 1825 visit to Cusco, Zubiaga organized a reception and crowning for him. However, seeing Zubiaga's central role in the city and popular support, Bolivar took off his crown and gave it to Zubiaga in turn, a moment considered "transformational" in Zubiaga's life by historian Claudia Nuñez.

Accompanying her husband on two expeditions to Upper Peru in 1828, she commanded troops in the taking of Paria. Remembered for her dislike of traditional feminine dress, she enjoyed firearms and wore a military uniform in battle. She has been described as a bold rider and an excellent shot.

Zubiaga became the first lady of Peru following the election of her husband, Agustín Gamarra, in the 1829 elections.

She died of tuberculosis.

She was a controversial person and suffered mobbing for false accusations of infidelity.
