= Hussars of Junín =

Traditional military unit in Peru

- Regimiento de Caballería «Glorioso Húsares de Junín» № 1 - Libertador del Perú
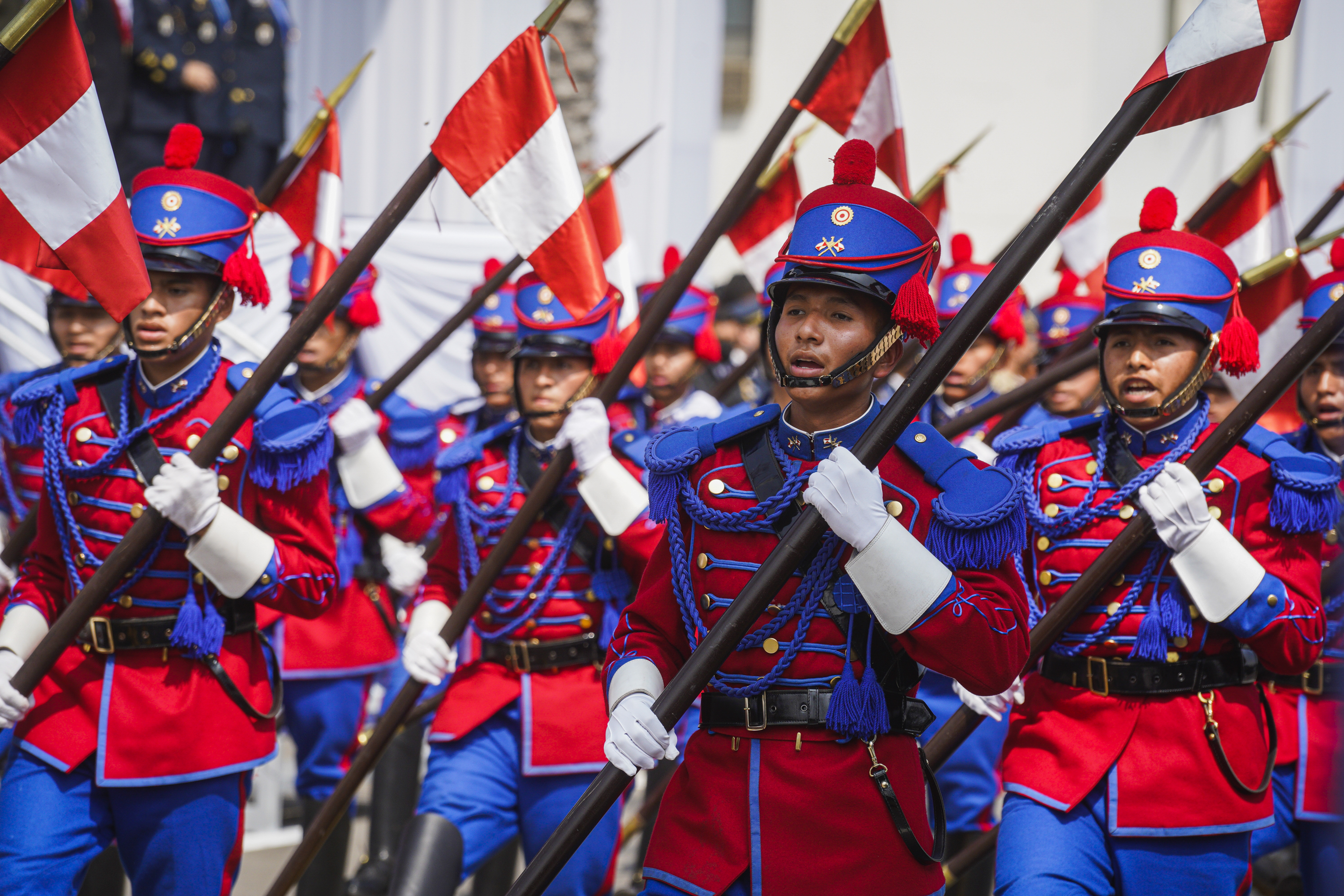
- Members marching in Lima
- Active: 1821–present
- Country: Peru
- Allegiance: President of Peru
- Branch: Peruvian Army
- Type: Cavalry
- Size: 3 squads: 210 men; 140 horses
- Part of: Peruvian Guard Legion
- Garrison/HQ: Cuartel Barbones, Lima
- Mottos: Honour and Loyalty (Spanish: Honor y Lealtad)
- Colors: Maroon
- March: "Trompetas de Caballería"
- Anniversaries: 18 August; 6 August
- Engagements: Peruvian War of Independence: Battle of Caucato; Battle of Junín; 2nd Intermedios campaign; Battle of Zepita; Upper Peru campaign; Gran Colombia–Peru War: Battle of Tarqui; Salaverry-Santa Cruz War: Battle of Uchumayo; Battle of Socabaya; War of the Confederation: Battle of Portada de Guías; Battle of Pisco; Battle of Cerro de la Sierpe; 1841 Bolivian–Peruvian War: Battle of Ingavi; Siege of Tarapacá; Peruvian Civil War of 1856–1858: Siege of Arequipa; Chincha Islands War: Battle of Callao; War of the Pacific: Tarapacá campaign; Battle of Quillagua; Battle of Pampa Germania; Battle of Tarapacá; Tacna and Arica campaign; Battle of Tacna

Commanders
- Current commander: Cavalry Col. Carlos Fabricio Castro Ugarte
- Notable commanders: Antonio Gutiérrez de la Fuente; Pedro Benigno Raulet; William Miller; Federico de Brandsen; Antonio Placencia Romero; José Andrés Rázuri; Manuel Isidoro Suárez; Domingo Nieto; Ramón Castilla

The Hussars of Junín (Spanish: Húsares de Junín), officially the Cavalry Regiment "Glorious Hussars of Junín" No. 1 Liberator of Peru (Spanish: Regimiento de Caballería «Glorioso Húsares de Junín» № 1 - Libertador del Perú), is a traditional light cavalry regiment of the Peruvian Army. Originally the 4th Squadron of the Peruvian Guard Legion, the unit was renamed in 1824 to its current name after its performance in the Battle of Junín.

== History ==
=== Origin ===
In July 1821, José de San Martín created on the basis of a squadron of the Army of the Andes, the Hussars of the General's Escort (Spanish: Húsares de la Escolta del General), which initially had sixty-four men under the command of French captain Pedro Benigno Raulet. This squadron was one of the first to enter Lima on 6 July 1821 and the one that accompanied the official delegation on the day of the Declaration of Independence of Peru. It was then incorporated into the troops besieging the Real Felipe Fortress until September of the same year, when its defenders capitulated.

On 18 August 1821, the Peruvian Guard Legion was created with a decree by San Martín, composed of an infantry battalion, made up of six companies (one of grenadiers, one of jägers and four of riflemen), two squadrons of light cavalry and a flying artillery company. San Martín arranged for Captain Raulet's squadron to serve as the basis for the creation of the two squadrons of Hussars of the Peruvian Legion, which would be under the general command of Lieutenant Colonel Guillermo Miller.

In 1822, these hussar squadrons gave rise to the Hussar Cavalry Regiment of the Peruvian Guard Legion with four squadrons of approximately one hundred men each. The fourth squadron of this unit was organized in Trujillo under the orders of Colonel Antonio Gutiérrez de la Fuente, with an initial force of one hundred and eight men.

During the Second Intermedios campaign, the first three squadrons of the regiment were commanded by Colonel Federico de Brandsen. On the basis of the fourth squadron that had remained in the north of Peru in 1823, the Cuirassiers Regiment of Peru (Spanish: Regimiento Coraceros del Perú) was created, which, after being merged with the remains of the Hussars of the Guard in 1824, was renamed Hussars of Peru (Spanish: Húsares del Perú).

In 1824, under the command of Colonel Antonio Placencia, the regiment took part in the Battle of Junín. In battle, the patriot army was forced to retreat in the face of an unforeseen royalist attack. The hussars decided to attack by surprise in the enemy rear, a decisive action that allowed the deployment of the patriotic troops to counterattack. Because of this, Simón Bolívar renamed the unit to its current name. After its performance in the decisive Battle of Ayacucho, the unit obtained the title of Liberator of Peru (Spanish: Libertador del Perú), this time under the command of the Argentine commander Manuel Isidoro Suárez.

=== War of the Pacific ===
During the War of the Pacific the unit participated in the campaigns of Tarapacá and Tacna, in October 1879, thirty-two hussars under the command of Lieutenant Colonel Belisario Suárez ventured behind the Chilean lines on a reconnaissance mission, obtaining in their retreat a victorious battle in Quillagua against Chilean cavalry. In November of the same year, a combined force of Peruvian and Bolivian hussars of about ninety men, which constituted the rearguard of the allied army, was destroyed by two squadrons of the Cazadores a Caballo regiment of the Chilean Army (one hundred and seventy-five men) perishing during the action its commander José Buenaventura Sepúlveda. In May 1880 a picket of hussars attacked a supply column of the Chilean army in the desert north of Tacna, capturing sixty mules loaded with water. During the Battle of Tacna, one hundred and six hussars fought as part of the allied cavalry, having fifty-three casualties during the action, including their second and third commanders.

=== 20th century ===
In February 1987, then President Alan García ordered that a "Peruvian character" be given to the presidential guard, which since 1904 had been made up of the "Mariscal Domingo Nieto" Cavalry Regiment, which had uniforms he considered to be similar to the ones used by the French Republican Guard. As a result, the Hussars of Junín became the new presidential escort until 2012, when the former regiment was reinstated as the presidential escort and the latter returned to Army Education and Doctrine Command in Chorrillos.

On 3 June 1989, during the intensification of subversive actions in Lima, the unit suffered a terrorist attack while being transported on a bus to the Government Palace on the street of the same name. Seven soldiers died, and another sixteen were wounded, in addition to six civilians being wounded.

=== 21st century ===
The Hussars of Junín regiment is composed of 4 squadrons, and its uniform differs from its original English-inspired design by Guillermo Miller.

The unit's guard mounting ceremony was declared part of the national heritage of Peru in 2010.

== See also ==
- Great Military Parade of Peru
