= Great Military Parade of Peru =

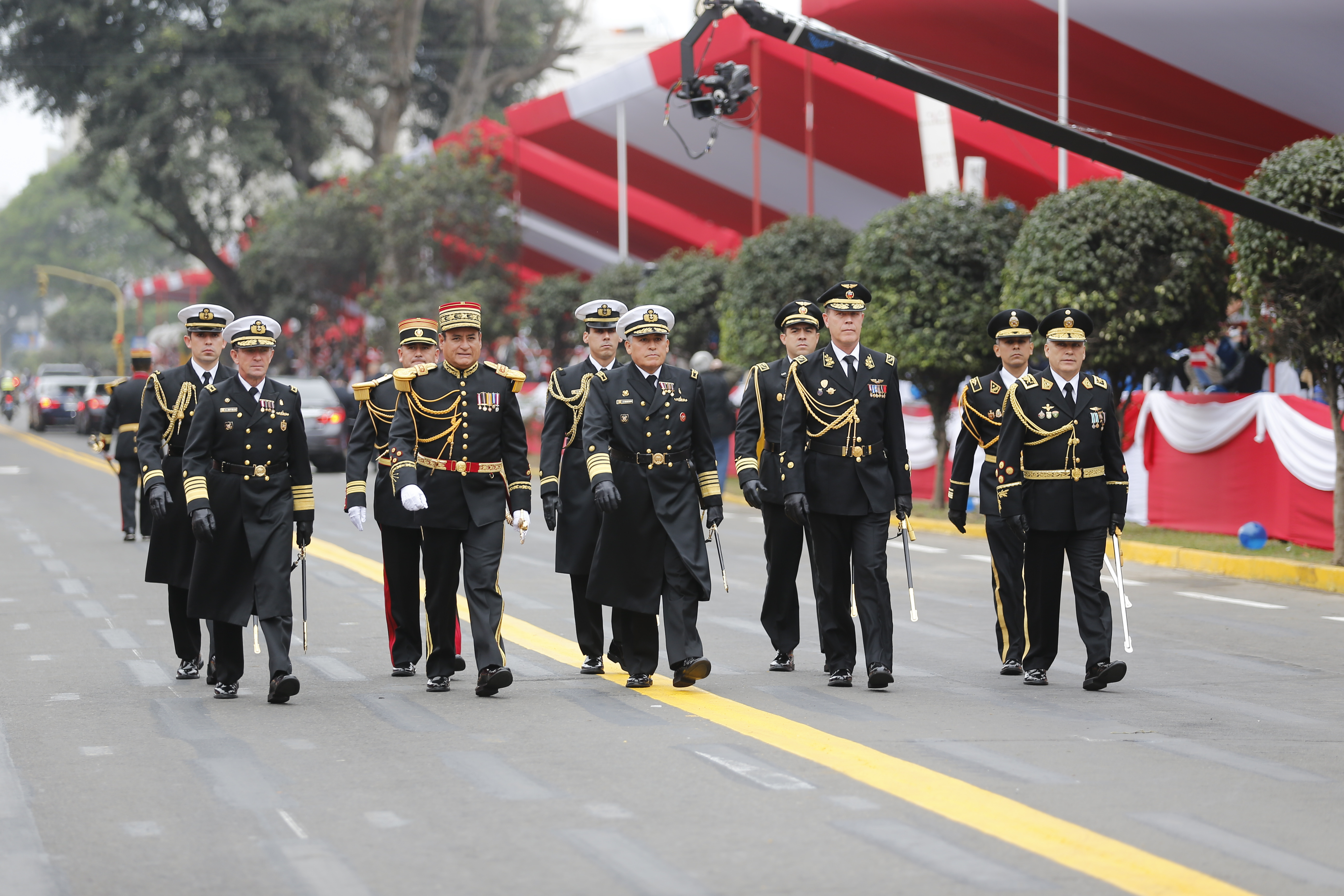
The parade in 2015.

On July 29 every year, the Grand Military Parade of Peru celebrating the anniversary of Peru's declaration of independence from Spain in 1821 is held in Lima, the national capital, by members of the Peruvian Armed Forces and the National Police of Peru and is presided over by the President of Peru and his First Family, members of the Council of Ministers of Peru and the Congress of the Republic of Peru, other civil officials, ecclesiastical leaders, the Diplomatic Corps of Peru, and other invited guests, among them commanders and other officers and personnel of the Armed Forces and the National Police.

The celebrations since 1939 have always been held a day after Peruvian Independence Day on July 28, where the Te Deum held in the Cathedral of Lima is the focal point of the celebrations. The parade formally marks the end of Independence Day festivities nationwide.

== Introduction and history ==
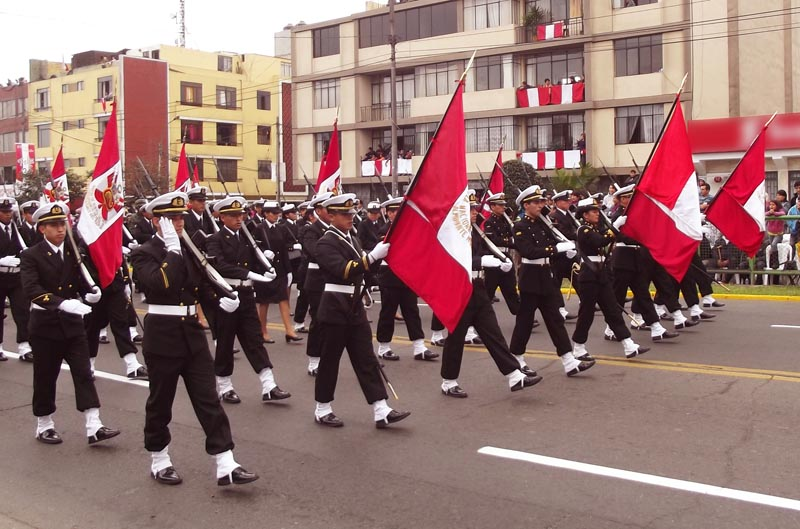
Marina de Guerra del Perú. Parada Militar 2012.

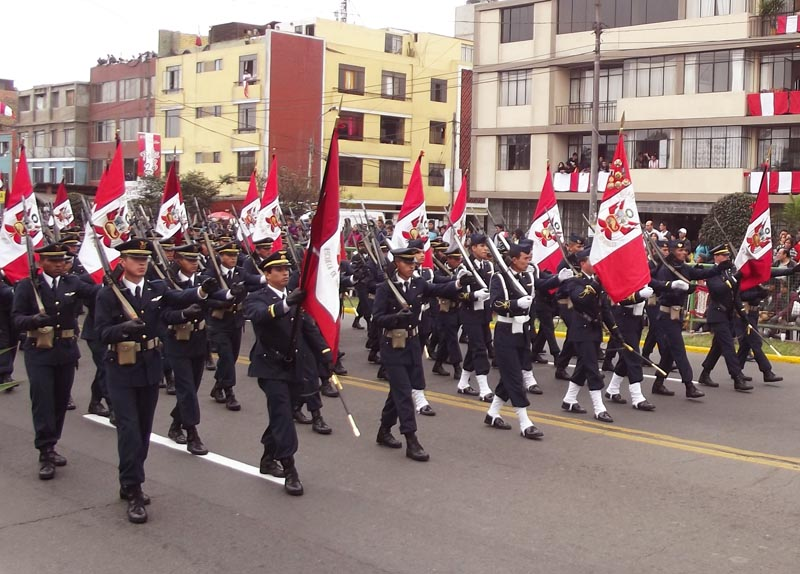
Fuerza Aérea del Perú. Parada Militar 2012.

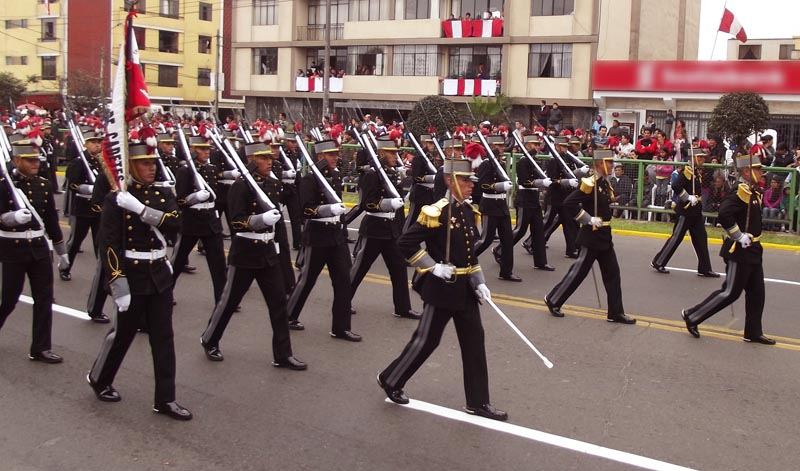
Escuela Militar de Chorrillos. Parada Militar 2012.

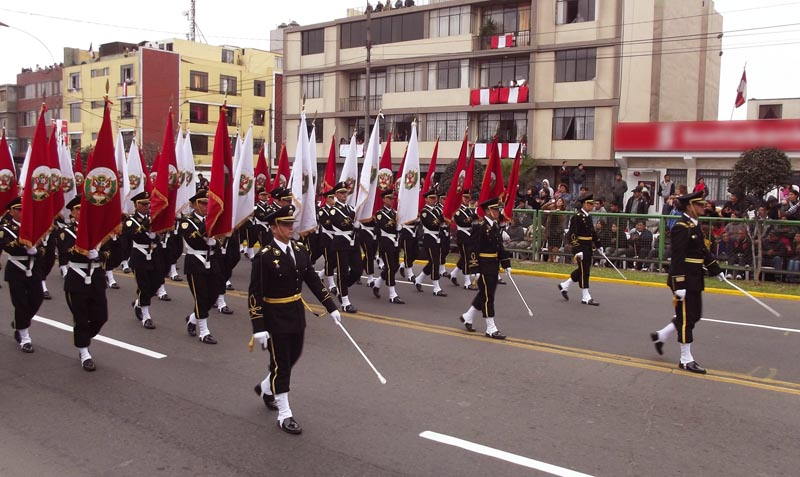
Policía Nacional del Perú. Parada Militar 2012.

Every July 28 until 1937, military parades led by the Peruvian Armed Forces were held in Lima's Plaza de Armas, adjacent to the Government Palace, right after the Te Deum at the City Cathedral. But on July 28, 1921, after the Te Deum the military parade was held in Plaza Bolivar to celebrate the nation's centennial year.

In 1938, the parades were moved to the Campo de Marte, at the site of the old Sta. Beatriz Hippodrome. It stayed there until 1960. The next year, emulating the Chilean style holiday system, the parade moved to its new date of July 29, where it stays to this day.

The parade moved to Lima's Avenida Brasil on July 29, 1961, and would stay there until 1974. The next year, months after the February 5 coup d'état against the military government, it was suspended by President General Francisco Bermundez, and stayed that way for 3 more years.

The parades returned to Avenida Brazil in 1979, in time for the 100th year of the War of the Pacific, and remained so until 1984. In 1985, the parade moved to Admiral Grau Plaza to celebrate the 150th birth anniversary of the Gentleman of the Seas, Grand Admiral of Peru Miguel Grau, the Peruvian naval hero of the War of the Pacific.

But starting the next year, President of Peru Alan García decided to hold the parade in the Plaza Mayor for the first time in years, due to security reasons. The parades held there lasted until 1989, and in 1990 returned to the Campo del Marte, where it stayed until 1992. In 1993, the parades, now presided by President Alberto Fujimori, returned to Avenida Brasil, but for the first time, the parade happened on July 27, the eve of Independence Day. The parades stayed on that location until 1996, and then returned to the Campo de Marte from 1997 to 1999. In 2000, the parades were held at the Peruvian Army Headquarters Parade Ground for the first time, due to anti-government protests against the disputed election results.

For the first time in 2001, the parade, due to President Alejandro Toledo's visit to Cusco on July 29, was held in the Avenida Brasil on July 30. The next year, it returned to the Campo de Marte until 2004, then came back to the Avenida Brasil location from 2005 to 2007, and came back to the Campo de Marte in 2008. The 2009 parade, originally scheduled for July 29, was held off (due to the AH1N1 epidemic) until December 8, the feast of the Immaculate Concepcion and on the eve of Peruvian Army Day and the anniversary of the Battle of Ayacucho, still in the Campo de Marte. It was the first time that the motorized parade started off first and after the historical troops and the UN peacekeepers contingent, the foot parade was divided into three segments: military schools, military NCO schools, and active units.

In 2010, the parades came back in the Avenida Brasil venue, and for the first time civil contingents representing veterans of the Peruvian Army and recipients of Army programs for the poor and indigenous peoples marched past the tribune, plus alumni of Armed Forces educational institutions.

The 2011 parade, the first under President Ollanta Humala, marked the nation's 190th year of nationhood and for the first time, the Peruvian Army Reserve, civil militias of the Armed Forces as well as contingents from all over South America joined the parade march past.

2012 saw the first school participation in the parade for the first time, and the order in the historical segment reflected the order of appearance of the Armed Forces and the National Police, and for the first time in that segment, the Chavin de Huantar Commando Company placed last.

2013's parade was the first to include appearances from the National Penetencial Institution and ground formations of the Peruvian Firefighters Corps plus a delegation of the BECA 18 program and veterans of the nation's peacekeeping service, and the historical segment as a whole was disbanded, thus the services on parade had their historical formations joining them. For the first time the Peruvian Naval School and the Naval Technological and Training Center fielded historical companies and color guards wearing Peruvian Navy uniforms worn during the War of the Pacific, while the Peruvian Army increased their historical units to eight. The RPP Noticias coverage of the parade was the first to include an online and mobile voting scheme to select the best contingents of this year's parade.

2014 saw the first parade by the Naval School and the Naval Technological and Training Center having their contingents marching in the historic dress uniforms worn the year before by the leading companies. The Dragoon Guards Regimental Band mounted a mini-concert before the mounted column segment.

After a one year break, the parade returned in the Army Headquarters in 2021 and in Avenida Brasil in 2023.

=== Summary of the parade ===
- Arrivals
- Arrival of the President of Peru
- Review of the guard of honor
- Flag Raising and moment of silence (Last Post)
- Exit of the guard of honor
- Authorization from the parade commander
- Entrance of the bands
- Post march of the bands
- Marchpast proper
- Mobile and mounted columns and flypast
- Departures

== The parade in full detail ==
In each of the venues mentioned earlier, a long grandstand with red and white banners and cockades (the colors of the Flag of Peru) is built. The stage includes the tribune in which the principal reviewing officers will watch the parade proceedings.

As the President arrives escorted by troopers and the mounted band of the Presidential Life Guard Dragoons Regiment (Presidential Life-Guard Escort of the Republic of Peru), the parade commander and Commanding General, Lima Garrison gives the order to begin the review of the guard of honor composed of the members of the Armed Forces and the National Police.

After this is done, he then gives the order to commence the flag ceremony.

The flag raising (to the tune of the March of the Flags), the playing of the National Anthem of Peru and a tribute to all deceased active and retired military and police personnel then follow, and then the guard of honor battalion is ordered by the PC to march off. But there are times that the battalion is ordered to stand at ease until the massed bands arrive when it marches off.

Before the bands would arrive the Commanding General, Lima Garrison informs the President of his permission to commence the parade, which is then approved. Afterwards, he drives off the stage in order for the Massed Bands to march in.

The Massed Bands, made up of the central bands of the Army, Navy, Air Force and National Police then march on to the grounds. When the bands form up the parade starts marching, led by the Commanding General, Lima Garrison (who also serves as the parade commander), usually the billet of a Lieutenant General, and his staff. Then the historical segment begins, led by color guards of the 6 units on parade:

- Commando Company "Chavín de Huantar"
- Peruvian Legion of the Guard Infantry Battalion and Light Artillery Battery
- Marine Historical Company "CPT Juan Fanning García"
- Airborne Platoon 72nd Squadron
- Police Historical Company "Guards Inspector (CG) Mariano Santos Mateos"
- Peacekeeping Battalion of the Peruvian Armed Forces "Peru"

The historical segment leads the marchpast in quick time of the Peruvian Armed Forces (in several occasions several units marched in double time on the parade). In recent years however foreign contingents have led the parade together with reserve and indigenous military units and alumni from the Leoncio Prado Military Academy.

=== Composition of the parade ===
==== Historical and present day segments ====
- Schools contingents
- National Penitentiary Service
- National Civil Defense Institution (joint contingent with private and public sector)
- Peruvian General Volunteer Firefighters Corps
- Lima City Council Security Service
- Alumni Association of the Leoncio Prado Military Academy
- Peruvian Army Reserve
- Peruvian Air Force Reserve
- Peruvian Navy Reserve
- Peacekeeping Battalion of the Peruvian Armed Forces "Peru"
- Self-Defense Committees of the ethnic minorities of Peru

==== Marchpast in quick time and flypast ====
- Peruvian Navy
  - Central Grand Band of the Peruvian Navy
  - Marine Historical Company "CPT Juan Fanning García"
  - Peruvian Naval School
  - Naval Technical Instruction and Training Center
  - Naval Surgeons' School
  - Peruvian Merchant Marine Academy "Grand Admiral of Peru Miguel Grau"
  - Peruvian Naval Infantry
  - Naval Special Operations Force
  - Peruvian Coast Guard
  - Peruvian Naval Police
  - Peruvian Navy Reserve
  - Flypast of Peruvian Naval Aviation
- Peruvian Air Force
  - Peruvian Air Force 2nd Air Region Band
  - Airborne Platoon of the 72nd Squadron
  - Peruvian Air Force Academy
  - Peruvian Air Force Aeronautic Education Superior Institute
  - Lima Air Garrison
  - Air Defense Command
  - Air Force Reserve
  - Air Force Police
  - Air Force Special Forces
  - Air Force Reserve
  - Flypast of jet aircraft, trainer aircraft and combat and support helicopters of the Peruvian Air Force
- Peruvian Army
  - Peruvian Army Regional Band
  - Peruvian Legion of the Guard Infantry Battalion, Platoon from the Hussars of Junín and Light Artillery Battery
  - Commando Company "Chavín de Huantar"
  - Chorrillos Military School
  - Army Technical School
  - Army Medical School
  - Army Education Command
  - Army Operations Command
    - Army Infantry Units
    - Army Engineering Units
    - Army Artillery
    - Army Logistics
    - Army Military Police Command
    - Army Special Forces
    - Army Services Command
  - Flypast of helicopters and fixed wing aircraft of Peruvian Army Aviation
- National Police of Peru
  - Massed Bands of the NPP
  - Police Historical Company "Ensign (CG) Mariano Santos Mateos"
  - Mariano Santos Mateos Police Academy
  - National Police Higher Technical Schools
  - National Police NCO Academies
  - National Police Medical Academy
  - Traffic Police
  - Investigations Police
  - Rescue Police
  - NPP Special Forces
  - National Police Aviation Directorate flypast

==== Mounted column ====
- Mounted Band of the Presidential Life Guard Dragoon Guards Regiment "FMAR Domingo Nieto"
- Mounted Ceremonial Squadron, Presidential Life Guard Dragoon Guards Regiment "FMAR Domingo Nieto"
- Mounted Ceremonial Squadron, 1st Light Cavalry Regiment "Hussars of Junín"
- Mounted Ceremonial Squadron, Chorillos Military School
- Fanfare Band of the National Police Mounted Unit
- National Police Equestianism School
- National Police Academy Mounted Unit
- National Police Mounted Police Command

== See also ==
- National Police of Peru
- Peruvian Armed Forces
