= Peruvian Guard Legion =

Traditional military unit in Peru

- Legión Peruana de la Guardia
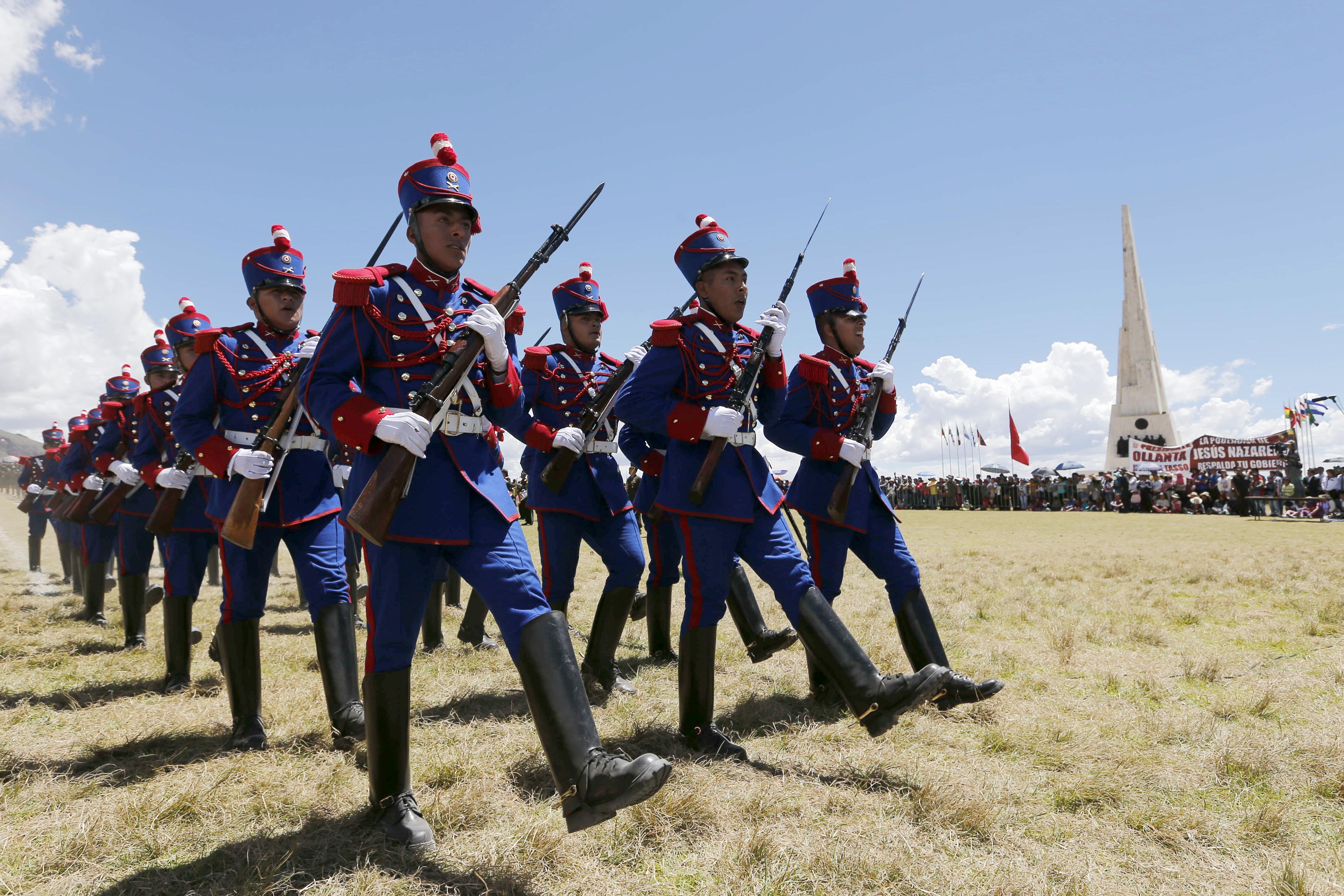
- Members marching in Ayacucho
- Active: 1821–present
- Country: Peru
- Allegiance: President of Peru
- Branch: Peruvian Army
- Type: Historical Unit
- Part of: 2nd Army Division
- Garrison/HQ: Real Felipe Fortress
- Motto(s): Origin of our army (Note: Spanish: Origen de nuestro ejército)
- Colours: Light blue, maroon and red
- March: "El Ataque de Uchumayo" (Note: Also known as "La Salaverrina") "Sesquicentenario"
- Anniversaries: 18 August
- Engagements: Peruvian War of Independence: Battle of Caucato; Battle of Junín; Battle of Ayacucho; 1st Intermedios campaign; Battle of Torata; Battle of Moquegua; 2nd Intermedios campaign; Battle of Zepita; Upper Peru campaign; Gran Colombia–Peru War: Battle of Tarqui; Salaverry-Santa Cruz War: Battle of Socabaya; War of the Confederation: Battle of Portada de Guías; Battle of Pisco; Battle of Matucana; Battle of Cerro de la Sierpe; Battle of Mecapaca; 1841 Bolivian–Peruvian War: Battle of Ingavi; Peruvian Civil War of 1856–1858: Siege of Arequipa; Chincha Islands War: Battle of Callao; War of the Pacific: Tarapacá campaign; Battle of Quillagua; Battle of Pampa Germania; Tacna and Arica campaign; Battle of Tacna; 1941 Ecuadorian–Peruvian War: Battle of Zarumilla

Commanders
- Current commander: Col. Jaime Sánchez Polo
- Notable commanders: José Bernardo de Tagle; William Miller

The Peruvian Guard Legion (Spanish: Legión Peruana de la Guardia) is a traditional military unit of Peru. It has participated in several conflicts since the country's independence and the unit's formation by José de San Martín in 1821. Its headquarters are located in the Real Felipe Fortress located in Callao.

== History ==
The unit was established by José de San Martín with a decree published on August 18, 1821. It was the first military unit of the new self-proclaimed Peruvian state, and thus, the origin of the Peruvian Army. Its purpose was to uphold the independence proclaimed against the Viceroyalty of Peru, with its first commander being José Bernardo de Tagle. Englishman Guillermo Miller was responsible for organizing the unit and also served as a commander.

The unit participated in the Peruvian War of Independence, including the decisive battles of Junín and Ayacucho, where it fought under the United Liberating Army of Peru. Later on it would see action in the War of the Confederation, the Chincha Islands War and the Ecuadorian–Peruvian War. The unit is currently part of the 2nd Army Division of the Peruvian Army.

== See also ==
- Hussars of Junín
- Great Military Parade of Peru
