= Alexis Bruix =

French military officer

Alexis Vital Joseph, Baron of Bruix, (Brest, France, 1790 – Lima, Peru, 1825), Alejo Bruix in Spanish, was French soldier who joined to the patriot armies to fight in the Spanish American Wars of Independence.

Son of Étienne Eustache Bruix, Admiral of the French Navy. Alexis was in the Napoleonic campaigns in the 5th Regiment of Chasseurs a Cheval (Horse Hunters). After the Battle of Waterloo went to Buenos Aires, where he arrived on June 14, 1818. This year Alexis was sent to fight in the Army of the Andes, in the Regiment of Horse Grenadiers. He participated in the Battle of Chacabuco, the Battle of Cancha Rayada and the Battle of Maipú. During the military campaign in southern Chile he fought in the Battle of Bío Bío.

Alejo joined General José de San Martín in Freedom Expedition of Peru. He participated in the campaign of Quito with Juan Lavalle, and following the battles of Riobamba and Pichincha and was promoted to lieutenant colonel. Back in Peru, he joined the Army of Bolívar as a colonel, and fought in the campaigns of Junín and Ayacucho in 1824. He died by accident in Lima in 1825.
