= El Campo de Marte =

Park in Lima, Peru

Coordinates: 12°04′06″S 77°02′29″W

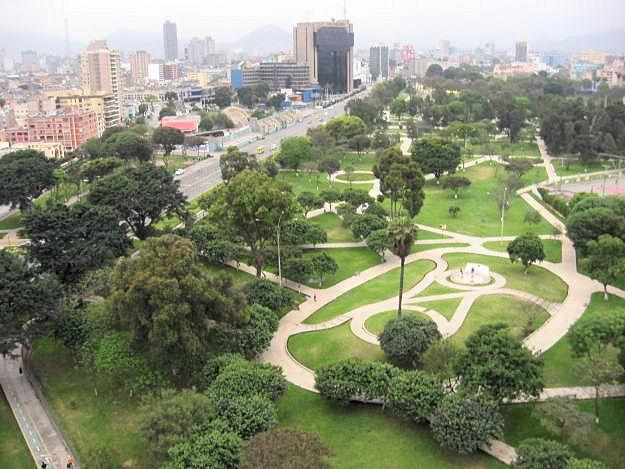
- Interactive map of El Campo de Marte
- Type: Public park
- Location: Jesús María District, Lima
- Area: 68,850 m^{2}
- Created: 1938

The Campo de Marte, also known as the Plaza de la Revolución, is a public park in Jesús María District, Lima, Peru. It is one of the largest parks in the metropolitan area of the city, and similar in size to the Park of the Exhibition and the Park of the Reserve. It was originally part of the Santa Beatriz area of Lima District and, from 1903 to 1938, housed the Santa Beatriz Hippodrome until its replacement by the one in San Felipe estate, located further south in the district.

The racetrack was eventually paved over with asphalt and given the street name Peruvianness Avenue (Spanish: Avenida de la Peruanidad). The stands, which remained after the racecourse was disestablished, are currently used for spectators watching the Great Military Parade of Peru, held annually on July 29, the day after Independence Day.

Considered the "lung" of the district (and the city), it is located near the headquarters of a number of government institutions, including the National Office of Electoral Processes, the ministries of Health, Labour and Defence, as well as of the Peruvian Air Force. It also houses an acoustical shell.

== History ==
Preceded by the first airport in the city from 1924, and the Santa Beatriz racetrack, where president Luis Miguel Sánchez Cerro was assassinated in 1933, it was inaugurated in 1938. A lagoon popular among locals that existed in the area's corner with a monument to Jorge Chávez was drained three years later to make way for the park.

A concert by Grupo Niche gathered over four hundred thousand people in 1989.

== Landmarks ==
=== Monument to the Defenders of the Border ===
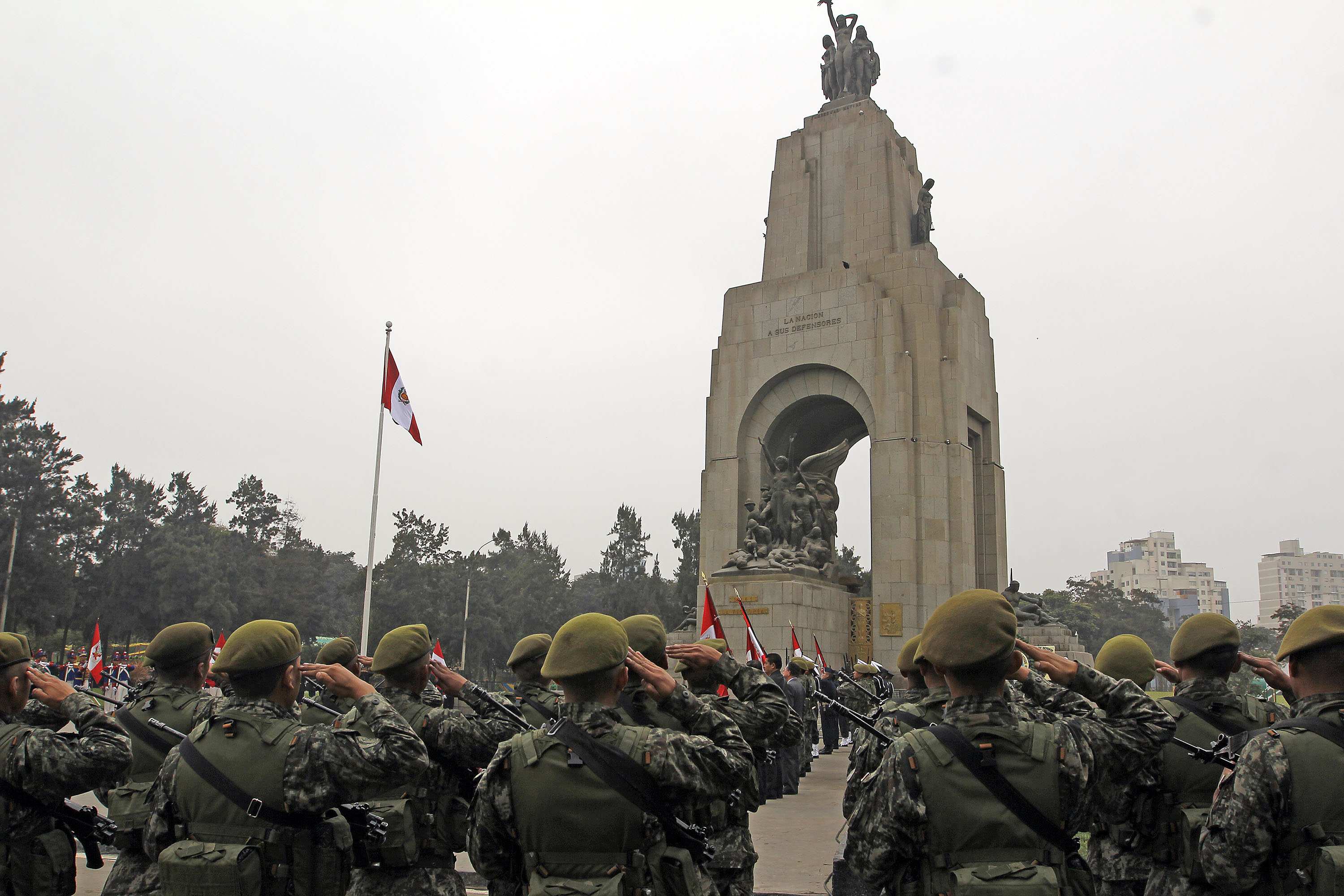
The monument in 2014.

The western part of the park houses a monument dedicated to the members of the Peruvian Army who fought in the Ecuadorian–Peruvian War of 1941. The work of the sculptor Artemio Ocaña, inaugurated on June 24, 1966, the quarry granite pedestal is 25 m high from its base and 28 human figures. Work began during the first presidency of Manuel Prado y Ugarteche, continuing under the presidencies of José Luis Bustamante y Rivero and General Manuel A. Odría, and concluding in 1966, during Prado's second term and coinciding with the silver jubilee of the Battle of Zarumilla.

The park houses a monument to the war fought in 1941 between Peru and Ecuador, along with a monument from the Japanese immigrant community in Peru. The former celebrates the ability to establish peace between the two countries, the latter resembles a bridge to symbolize the cultural connection between Peru and Japan. The park also houses the municipal stadium of Jesús María.

=== Monument to the mother ===
Made in tribute to the mother by the Municipality of Jesús María, the work made of bronze and granite, represents a woman with two children, one in her arms and the other on her haunches, surrounding her in an attitude of asking her to be held in her arms. It was inaugurated on July 25, 1969, with its sculptor Rafael Castillo Rodríguez.

=== Evangelisation Mural ===
It was executed by more than five hundred people from various Departmental Clubs, as well as many supporters, being advised by the Municipality of Lima, cooperating with private companies that donated enough material for the work. Various Peruvian artists collaborated with the mural, highlighting the most characteristic of each department and with a single purpose, to leave imprint the apostolic visit of John Paul II to Peru carried out from February 1 to 5, 1985. The coats of arms of each department are located from left to right in alphabetical order.

=== Monument to Jorge Chávez ===
Made in memory of the "First Promoter of Peruvian Aviation," who flew over the Swiss Alps on September 23, 1910. Bronze and pink granite were used for its elaboration, it is the work of the sculptor Eugenio Baroni, it was a gift from the Italian Colony, and it was inaugurated on September 23, 1937, marking the twenty-seventh anniversary of his death.

=== The fellowship tree ===
The fellowship tree (El árbol de la confraternidad) was planted by then president Augusto B. Leguía and the Venezuelan delegation, on December 9, 1924 on the first block of Avenida 28 de Julio on the occasion of the centenary of the Battle of Ayacucho.

=== Monument to Miguel de Cervantes Saavedra ===
The work of Peruvian sculptor Carlos Huertas, it was inaugurated on April 24, 1932.

=== The Eye that Cries ===
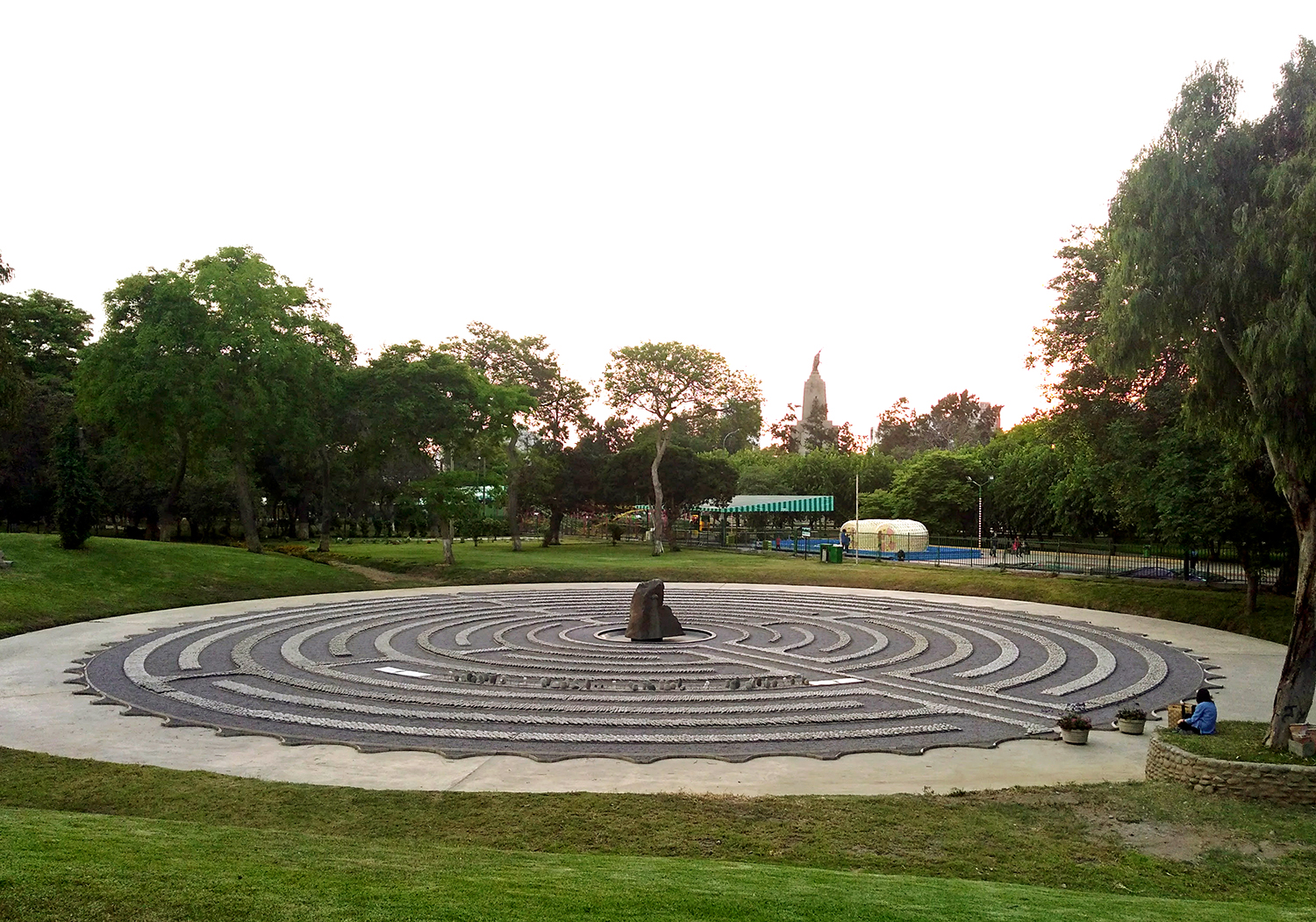
The monument in 2017.

The Eye that Cries (El Ojo que Llora in Spanish) is a memorial dedicated to the victims of terrorist violence and state repression during the era of terrorism in Peru between the years 1980 and 2000, intended to strengthen the collective memory of all Peruvians and to promote peace and reconciliation in the country. It is part of a larger project called The Memory Alameda which will incorporate other art pieces, large extensions of green areas and the Museum of Memory (Yuyanapaq).

The monument (in the form of a monolith) was vandalised in 2007 by supporters of Fujimorism.

=== Monument to Pets ===
In the eastern part, next to the aforementioned memorial, there is a giant kennel, called the Pet Park, in which a veterinary medicine area can be found, as well as an agility play area for pets and an area that belongs to the canine police. In a roundabout that divides the veterinary and canine police area from the free area for neighbours' pets to play, a monument has been erected in honor of the household pet, represented by the Peruvian hairless dog.

== Avenue ==
Avenida de la Peruanidad
- Interactive map of Avenida de la Peruanidad
- Part of: Campo de Marte
- From: Óvalo Jorge Chávez
- To: Jirón Nazca

Peruvianness Avenue (Spanish: Avenida de la Peruanidad) is the thoroughfare that divides the park in two. Its path was originally that of the racetrack, paved over after its disestablishment and integrated into the city's street network. The avenue is the location of the Great Military Parade of Peru, held annually on July 29.

== See also ==
- Hipódromo de Santa Beatriz
- Centennial of the Independence of Peru
