= Belisario Suárez =

Peruvian military personnel (1833–1910)

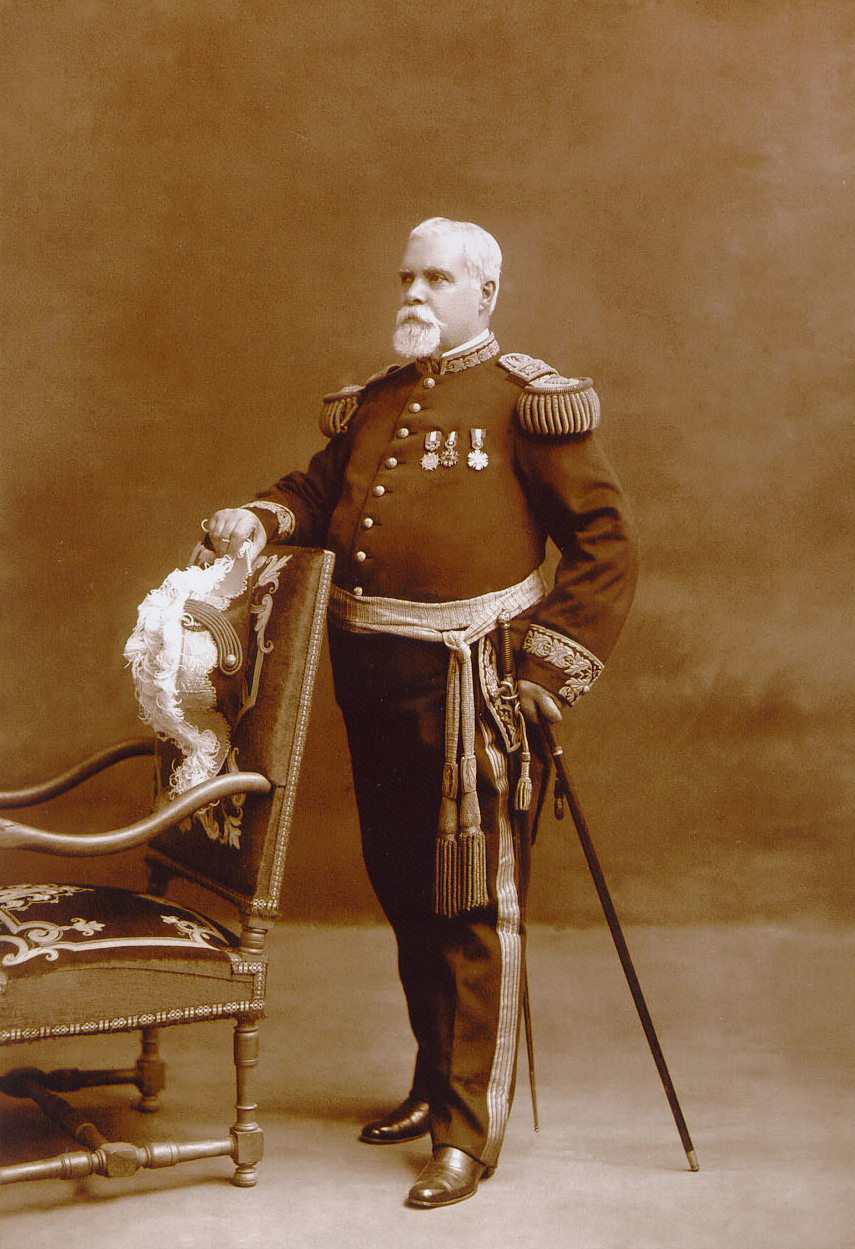
- Suárez in 1905

Deputy of the Republic of Peru of the Tarata Province
- In office May 30, 1886 – May 19 and 25, 1891
- President: Andrés Avelino Cáceres
- Prime Minister: Remigio Morales Bermúdez

Constituent Deputy of the Republic of Peru of the Jauja Province
- In office May 15, 1867 – November 15, 1867
- President: Mariano Ignacio Prado
- Prime Minister: Pedro José de Saavedra

Mayor of Miraflores
- In office 1910–1910
- President: Augusto Leguía
- Prime Minister: José Salvador Cavero Ovalle
- Preceded by: Leonidas Cáceres Menacho
- Succeeded by: Juan A. Figari

Personal details
- Born: September 22, 1833 Arica, Arica Province, Peru
- Died: July 10, 1910 (aged 76) Lima, Lima Province, Peru

Military service
- Allegiance: Peru
- Branch: Peruvian Army
- Years of service: 1867–1905
- Rank: Colonel
- Battles/wars: War of the Pacific: Loa Line and Altiplano Campaigns; Battle of Quillagua; Tarapacá Campaign; Battle of San Francisco; Battle of Tarapacá; Tacna and Arica Campaign; Battle of Tacna; Lima Campaign; Battle of San Juan and Chorrillos; Battle of Miraflores

Manuel Belisario Suárez y Vargas (1833–1910) was a Peruvian colonel and politician that was notable for serving in several battles of the War of the Pacific as well as holding several offices within the Congress of the Republic of Peru.

== Biography ==
=== Political career ===
He was elected a member of the Peruvian Constituent Congress of 1867, representing the Jauja Province during the government of Mariano Ignacio Prado. This congress issued the Peruvian Political Constitution of 1867, the eighth that governed the country, and which only lasted five months from August 1867 to January 1868.

He was elected substitute deputy for the Tarata Province in 1886 and reelected in 1889. Belisario Suárez was also Mayor of Miraflores at the beginning of the 20th century.

=== War of the Pacific ===
After the Battle of Iquique, where the armored frigate Independencia was lost, Colonel Belisario Suárez, head of a division stationed in Iquique which was near the second commander of the Independencia, captain of the frigate José Sánchez Lagomarsino. as soon as he arrived at Punta Gruesa. Subsequently, according to Guillermo Thorndike, General EP Mariano Ignacio Prado, ordered the immediate trial of the captain and Juan Guillermo Moore Ruiz, for the loss of the Independencia.

The beginning of Chile's land campaign found him in Iquique as Chief of Staff of the Army of the South. On November 2, 1879, he received the telegram transmitted from Pisagua by the Major general EP Juan Buendía to send to Pisagua the Hussars and the "Vanguard" Division: Chile had begun invasion of Peruvian territory.

Suárez was at a crossroads, since the Supreme Director of the War, General Mariano Ignacio Prado, had issued precise orders before the landing and these were to concentrate the allied troops and once the terrain had been chosen, launch them into a single decisive battle. Now, Buendía was asking him for the best of the allied troops for an isolated counterattack. This would disperse the allied troops, contradicting the orders of the Supreme Director of War, for which he decided to consult with General Prado. Prado replied to General Buendía that if he did not have the security of successfully holding the position, it was better to concentrate the forces to fight a final battle. Hours later, Colonel Suárez received another telegram from Buendía in Iquique:

"BUENDÍA TO SUÁREZ

ENEMY REJECTED

COMBAT CONTINUES "

Before November 2, 1879, Colonel Suárez had explored south of Iquique, making a deep incursion. There he understood that the Chilean invasion would arrive by sea, since Chile would spare its battalions the sufferings of a trek through the desert to Peru. In that exploration, he took prisoners, captured arms and ammunition and did not lose a single man. And he was also Chief of Staff of the Southern Allied Army, when at the end of that November 2, 1879, Pisagua changed ownership and received the last message from Major General Juan Buendía:

Good Suárez, Clothing, boots, highway, girdle, how much Iquique's costume has been lost in the fire; If I am in bad luck, Dancourt will take care of my luggage and deliver it as is, to my family.

In the march through the dreaded Tamarugal towards San Francisco, Colonel Belisario Suárez commanded the Second Division, made up of Colonel Velarde's First Division and the Villamil Division (Bolivian), apart from twelve guns with the Chief of Artillery, Castañón.

On this journey to San Francisco, Suárez attacked the Chilean cavalry of Captain Barahona which had decimated the Peruvian horsemen of the Húsares de Junín Regiment commanded by José Buenaventura Sepúlveda and had abandoned them in the desert to serve as food for the vultures; Of this squad of Peruvian hussars, only the Chincha soldier Tarsilio Ramírez survived but sustained serious wounds.

After the setback of San Francisco, Colonel Andrés Avelino Cáceres, asked Colonel Belisario Suárez to use the cavalry to reunite the dispersed, to which Suárez responded: “ ... I can't, the 262 horsemen and all their leaders abandoned the army to its fate. It evaporated, just like the “Vanguardia” Division, even General Buendía has disappeared. Frankly inconceivable, Señor Cáceres

During the Battle of San Francisco, the Peruvian cavalry, under the command of Colonel Ramírez, had chopped spurs towards Arica and the nearly four thousand Bolivians from the "Olañeta" and the "Illimani" divisions in the Allied Army of the South, abandoned the battlefield back to Oruro, Bolivia, with "leaving scattered accessories, ammunition, and good rhemingtons on the pampas". The army of the wayward President of the Republic of Bolivia, Hilarión Daza, did not even attend the meeting in San Francisco.

For the second time, since the Chilean invasion of Peruvian territory began until the Battle of San Francisco, Colonel Belisario Suárez was in command of the Army of the South, in the absence of General Juan Buendía.

On November 27, 1879, at the Battle of Tarapacá, the then Chief of the General Staff of the Army of the South, Colonel Belisario Suárez, imposed his authority and his coherent orders against the contradictory orders of General Juan Buendía, to organize the withering Peruvian counterattack, which the civil guard Mariano de los Santos fully fulfills until he snatches from a Chilean, the banner that was the pride of the Zouaves.

After the Battle of Tarapacá and the arrival of the ragged Army of the South in the city of Arica, Admiral Lizardo Montero Rosas, Political Military Chief of the South, dismissed Colonel Belisario Suárez replacing him with Colonel José de la Torre, doing the same with General Juan Buendía and placing him under arrest.

Despite Suárez having been dismissed and being tried for the setback of San Francisco, Admiral Lizardo Montero Rosas, at the time Supreme Commander of the First Army of the South, had some deference's towards him and gave him the command of the Third Division of the First Peruvian Army of the South.

In the Battle of Tacna, he was wounded in the leg and his horse was killed. This battle was lost not because of the lack of courage of the Peruvian troops, but because of the overwhelming numbers of Chilean infantry, cavalry and superior artillery, leaving the path to Arica, Arequipa and Lima free for the Chileans to occupy.

Tarapacá was at the bottom of a ravine with flanks almost inaccessible to climb, and the Chilean army came from the north through the heights, understanding that only audacity could save them and decided from attacked to become attackers. Cáceres would scale the surrounding hills and in a few hours, would defeat the stationed Chilean forces, taking prisoners, guns and banners. This opened the way for Suárez the way to march to Arica in search of food and ammunition. His final instances of active military participation were at the battles of San Juan and Miraflores.

His remains rest in the Crypt of Heroes in the Cementerio Presbítero Matías Maestro in Lima.
