= Monument to the Defenders of the Border =

Monument in Peru

- Monumento a los defensores de la frontera
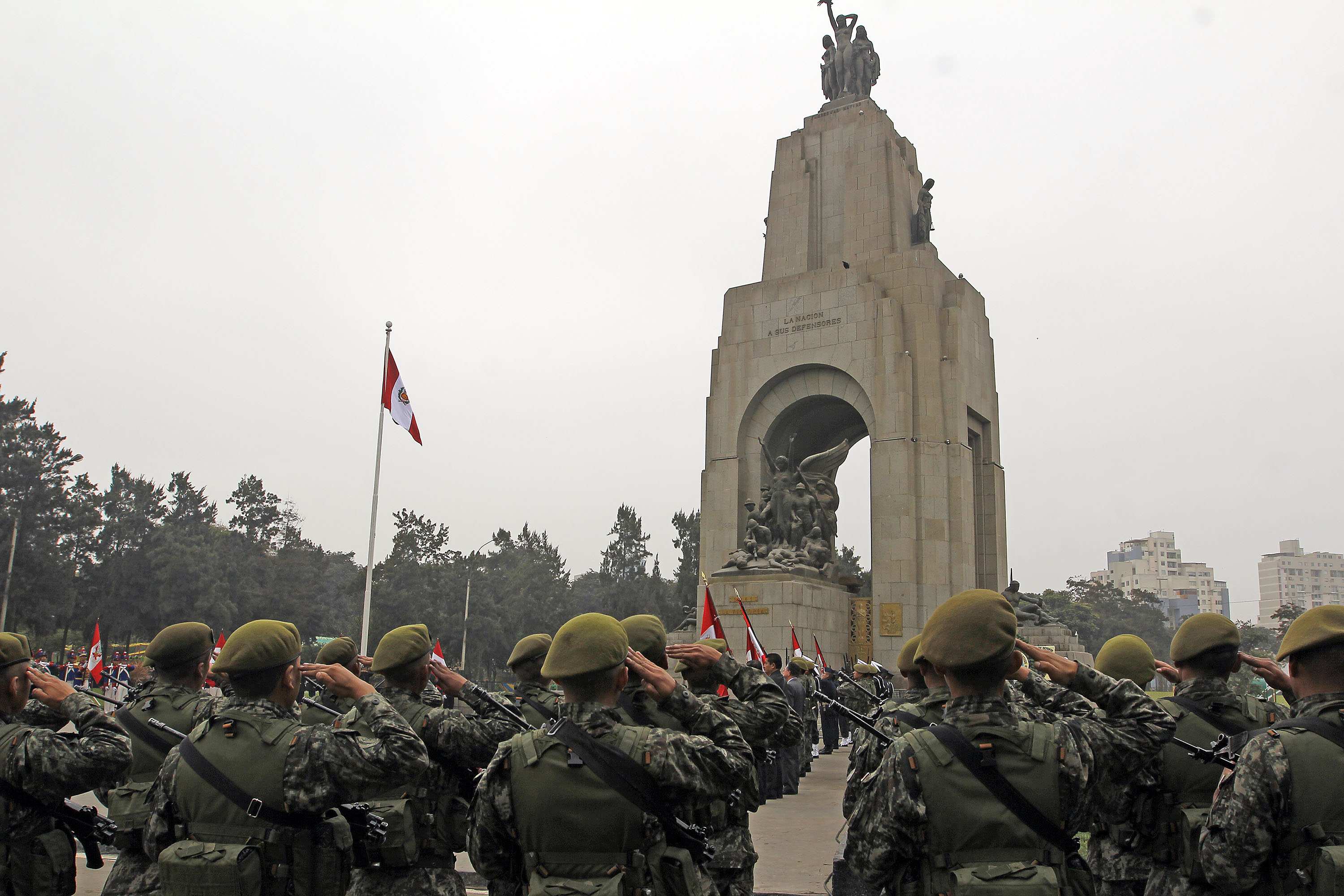
- Interactive map of Monument to the Defenders of the Border
- Location: El Campo de Marte, Lima
- Coordinates: 12.0683°S 77.0412°W
- Designer: Artemio Ocaña
- Dedicated to: Northern Army Detachment

The Monument to the Defenders of the Border (Spanish: Monumento a los defensores de la frontera) is a commemorative sculptural complex located in the Campo de Marte in Lima, Peru. Its author was the Peruvian sculptor Artemio Ocaña. It was erected between 1944 and 1945 in honor of those who fell during the Ecuadorian–Peruvian War of 1941.

== History ==
Once the war ended, the government of Manuel Prado Ugarteche, eager to manage the Peruvian victory, began a propaganda programme that included the erection of a commemorative monument whose execution was put out to public competition. The winner was Artemio Ocaña, then a professor at the Lima School of Fine Arts. The bronze figures were made in Bruno Campaiola's foundry thanks to a popular subscription.

The monument was inaugurated on July 24, 1945. Despite this, it was not completed, its work continuing during the government of José Luis Bustamante y Rivero and Manuel A. Odría, concluding on June 24, 1966, paradoxically in the second presidency of Prado Ugarteche, coinciding with the silver jubilee of the Battle of Zarumilla.

In June 2022, the councilor of the metropolitan municipality, Carlo Ángeles, reported through his social networks the disappearance of four bronze doors that were inside the monument.

== Overview ==
The monument is conceived as a quarry granite pedestal 25 meters high from its base and 28 human figures. At the front of the monument stands out the group of La Gloria, La Patria y La Victoria, which houses fourteen figures in combative action. The building is topped by another sculptural group that represents the three provinces claimed by Ecuador (Tumbes, Jaén and Maynas). In the back, a bronze statue group represents the American Brotherhood, symbolized by a handshake between a young Peruvian and another Ecuadorian, sealing the friendship in both towns.

On one side there is a figure that represents Justice, on the other side, The Law, which symbolizes the international law through which border problems are resolved. There are statues that represent the channels of the Marañón River and the Amazon River.

== Gallery ==
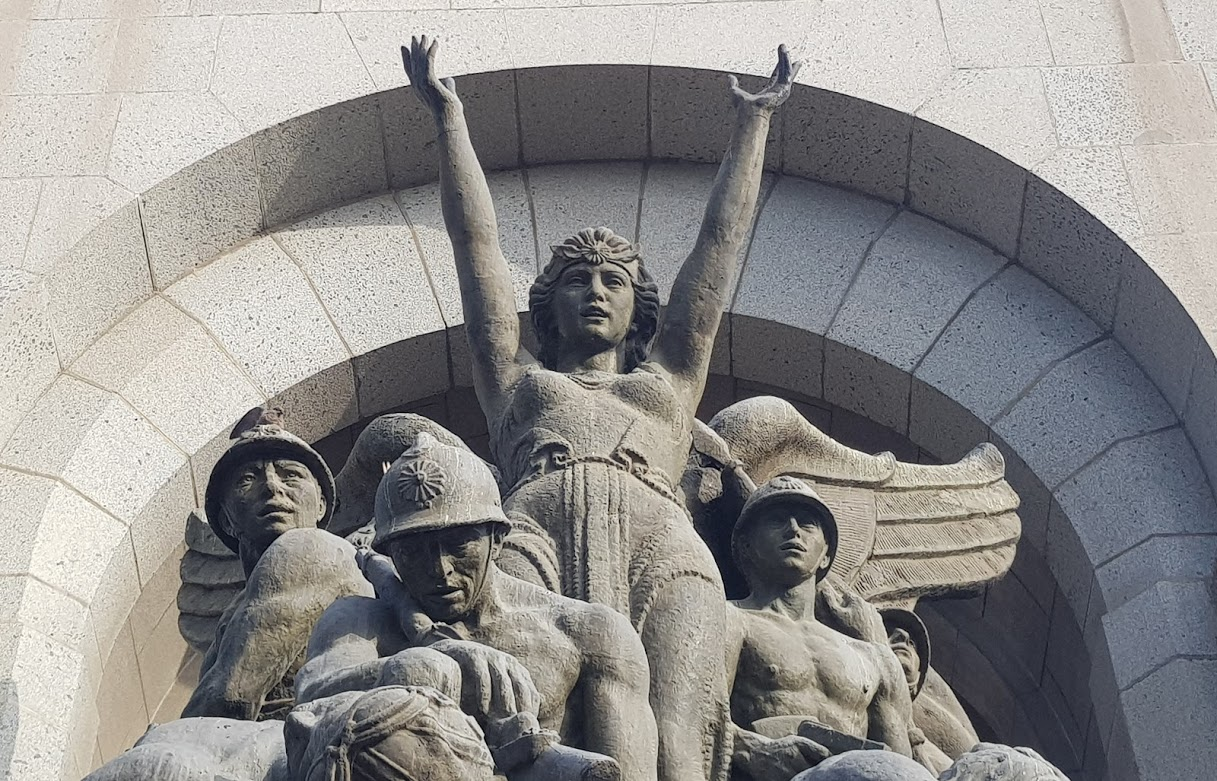
La Victoria

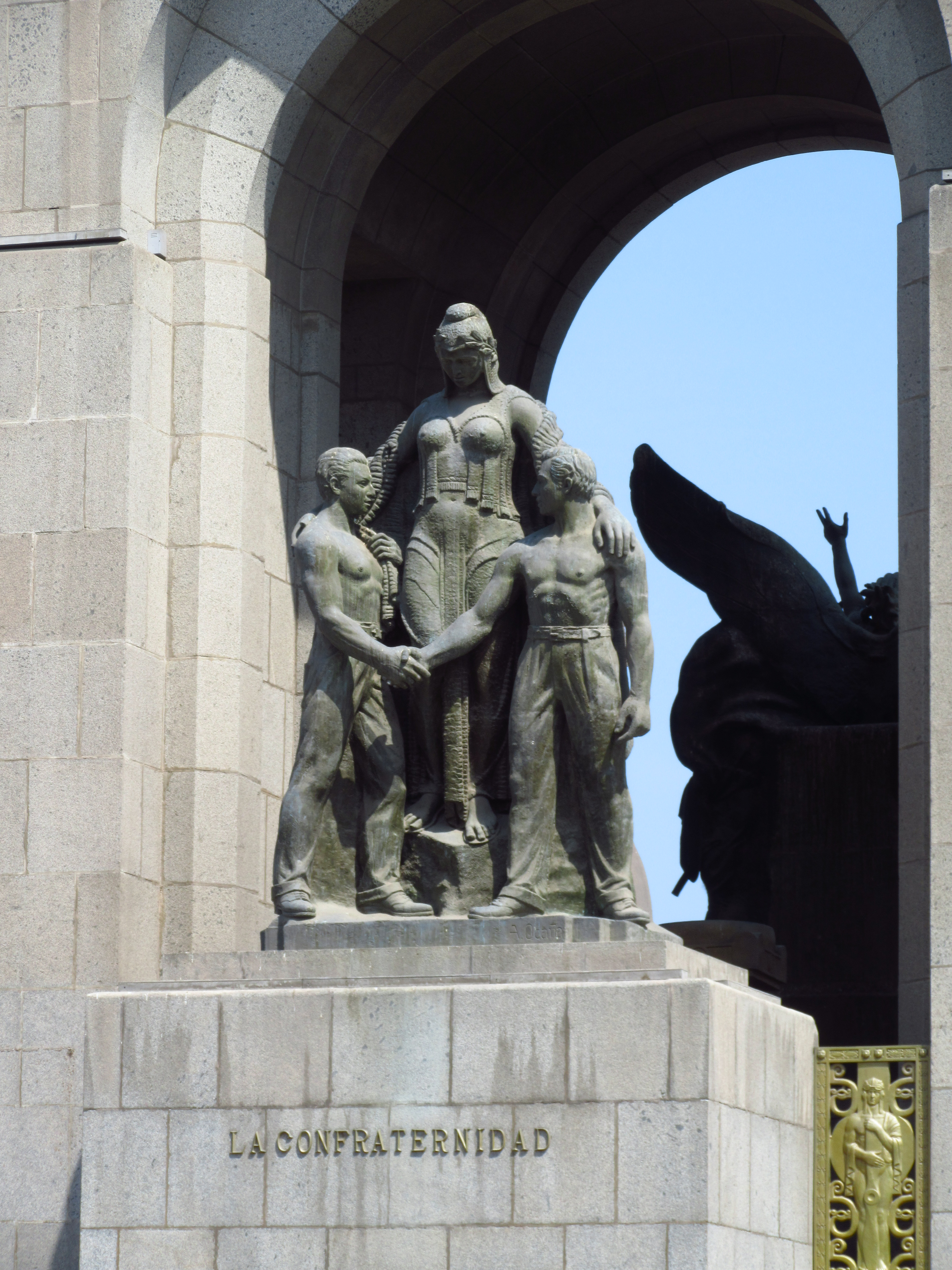
La Confraternidad

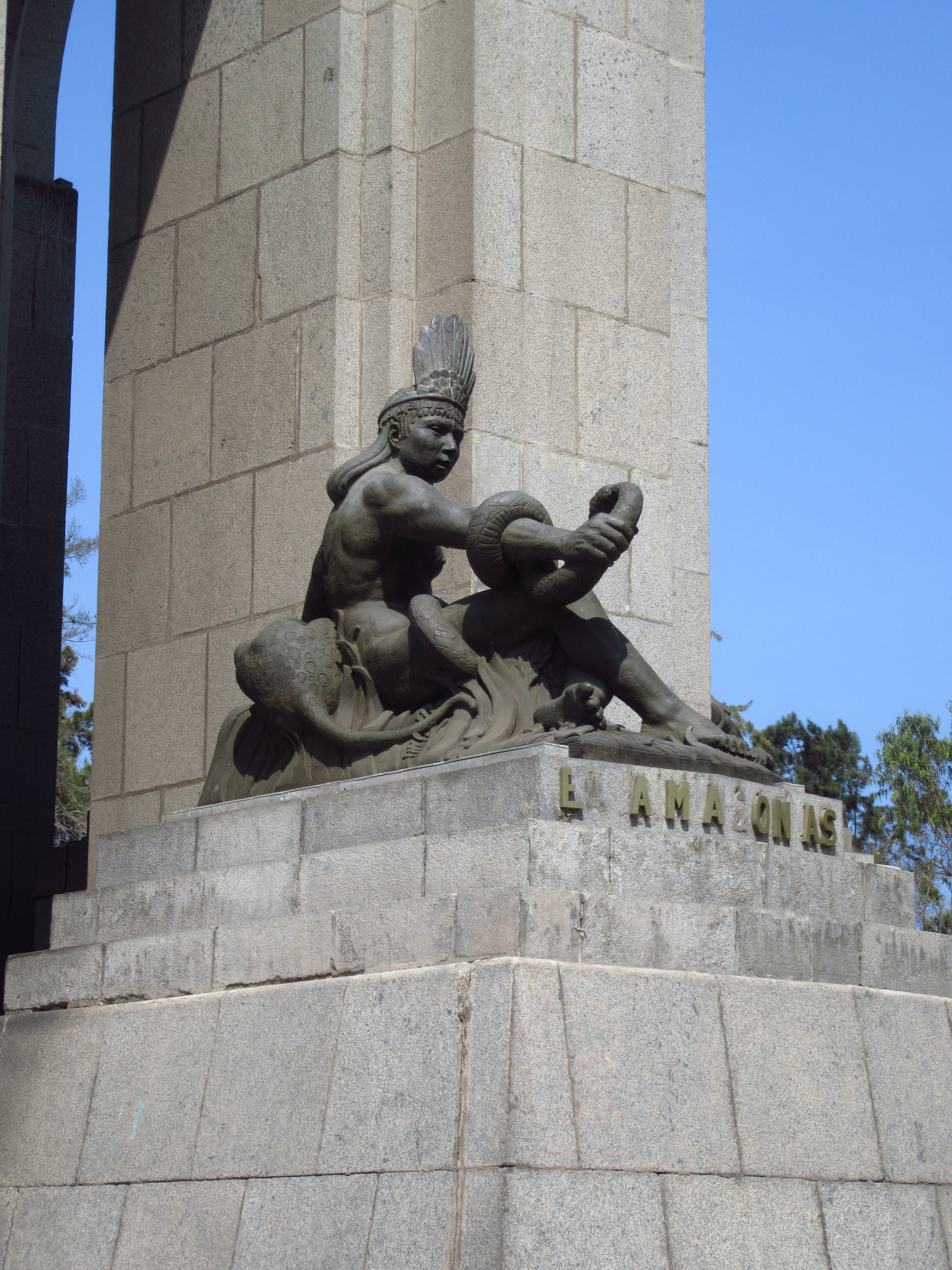
El Amazonas

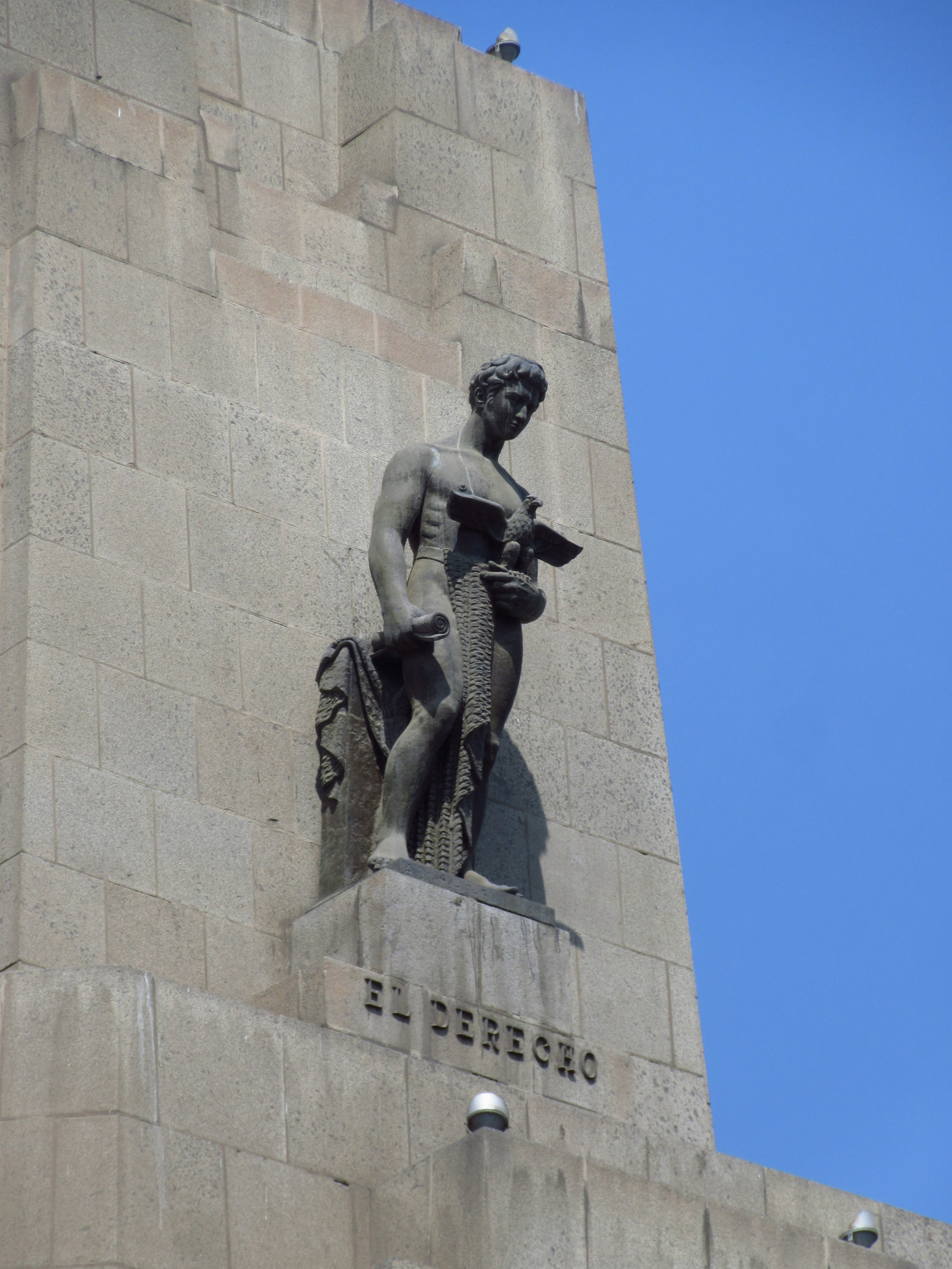
El Derecho

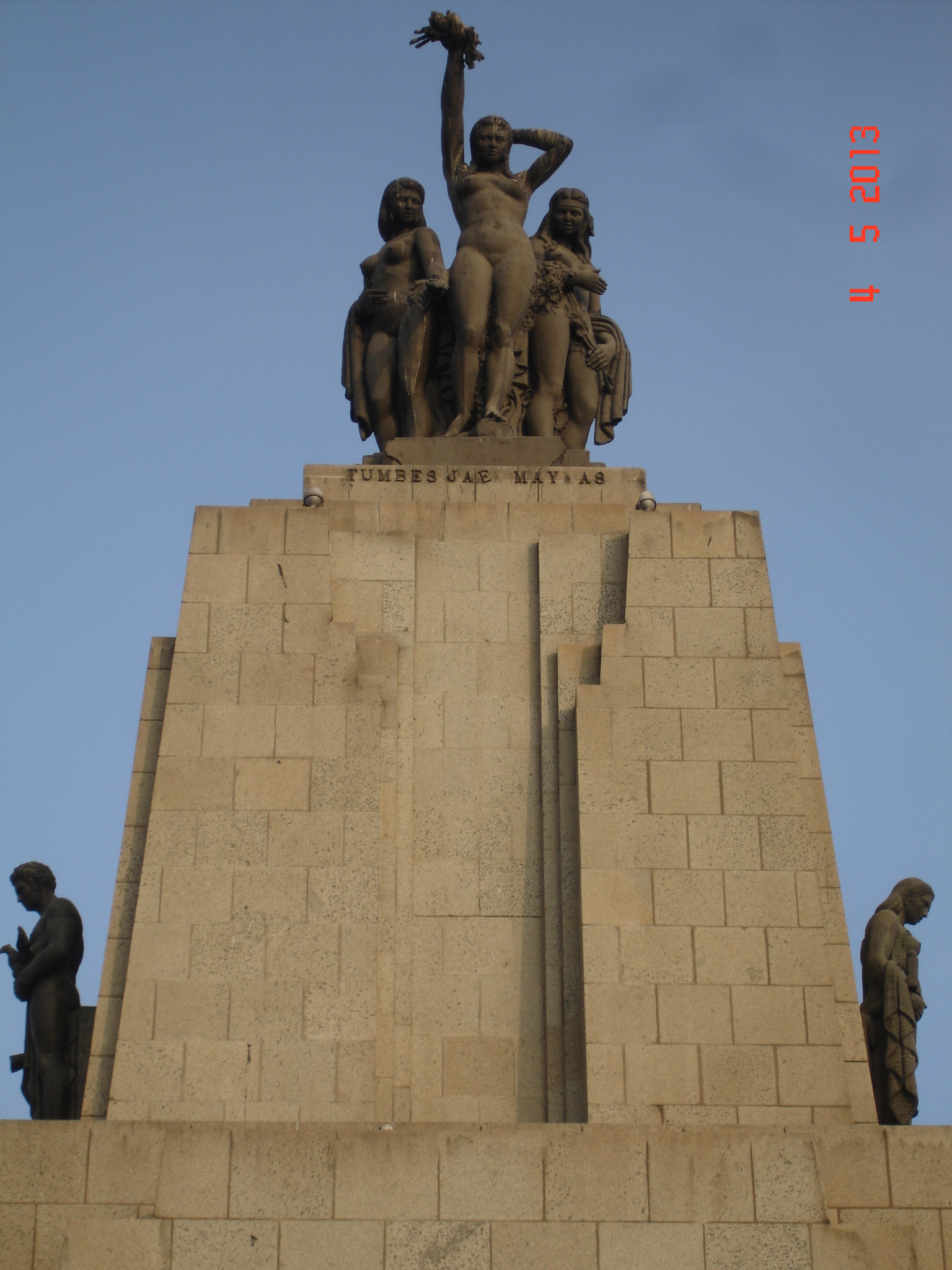
Tumbes, Jaén and Maynas

== See also ==
- Ecuadorian–Peruvian territorial dispute
