= Mariscal Domingo Nieto Cavalry Regiment Escort =

"Mariscal Domingo Nieto" Cavalry Regiment Escort
- Regimiento de Caballeria "Mariscal Domingo Nieto" Escolta del Presidente de la República
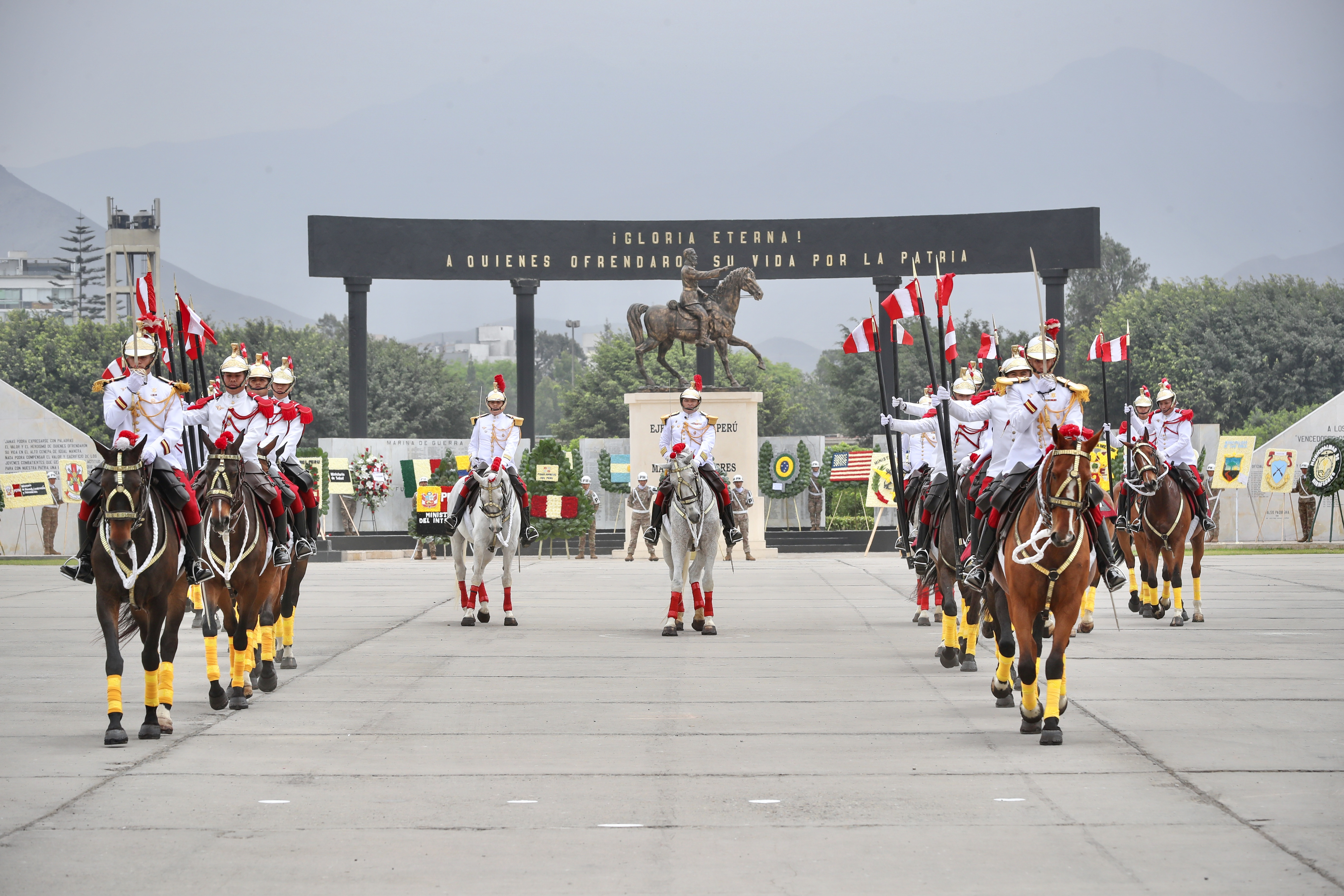
- Life Guard Dragoons Regiment during the 2019 commemoration of the Battle of Ayacucho.
- Active: 1904–1987; 2012–present
- Country: Peru
- Allegiance: President of Peru
- Branch: Peruvian Army
- Type: Cavalry (Dragoon guards)
- Role: Memorial affairs, ceremonies and special events (one squadron)
- Size: Three squadrons
- Part of: 2nd Army Division
- Garrison/HQ: Cuartel Barbones, Lima
- Nickname: The Escort Horse Rider
- Patron: Domingo Nieto
- Motto: Unidos así venceremos (English: Victorious together)
- Colors: Garnet
- March: Several, see list: Cavalry Trumpets (Traditional); Trot No. 5 (Traditional); Prince (Traditional); 3rd Cavalry (Traditional); Escort Regiment (Traditional); Allegro from the Music for the Royal Fireworks(Modern); O Fortuna from Carmina Burana (Modern)
- Anniversaries: September 19

Commanders
- Current commander: Col Cavalry EP. Jorge Andrés Anticona Mujica

Insignia
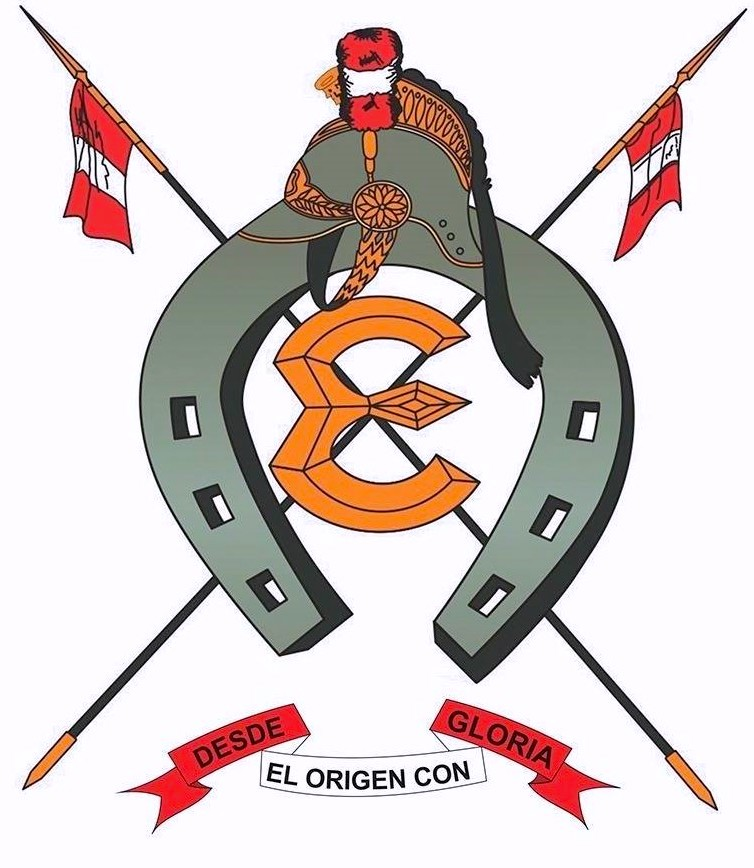
- Emblem

The "Mariscal Domingo Nieto" Cavalry Regiment Escort (Spanish: Regimiento de Caballería "Mariscal Domingo Nieto" Escolta del Presidente de la República) is the Household Cavalry and Dragoon Guards regiment of the Peruvian Army since 1904, having been inactive from 1987 to 2012.

Its primary purpose is providing the ceremonial protection of the President of Peru and as well as public duties on the Government Palace in Lima. It is one of Latin America's foremost guard regiments, and one of 2 active Household Cavalry regiments of the Peruvian Armed Forces, the other being the 1st Mechanized Cavalry Regiment "Hussars of Junín".

== History ==
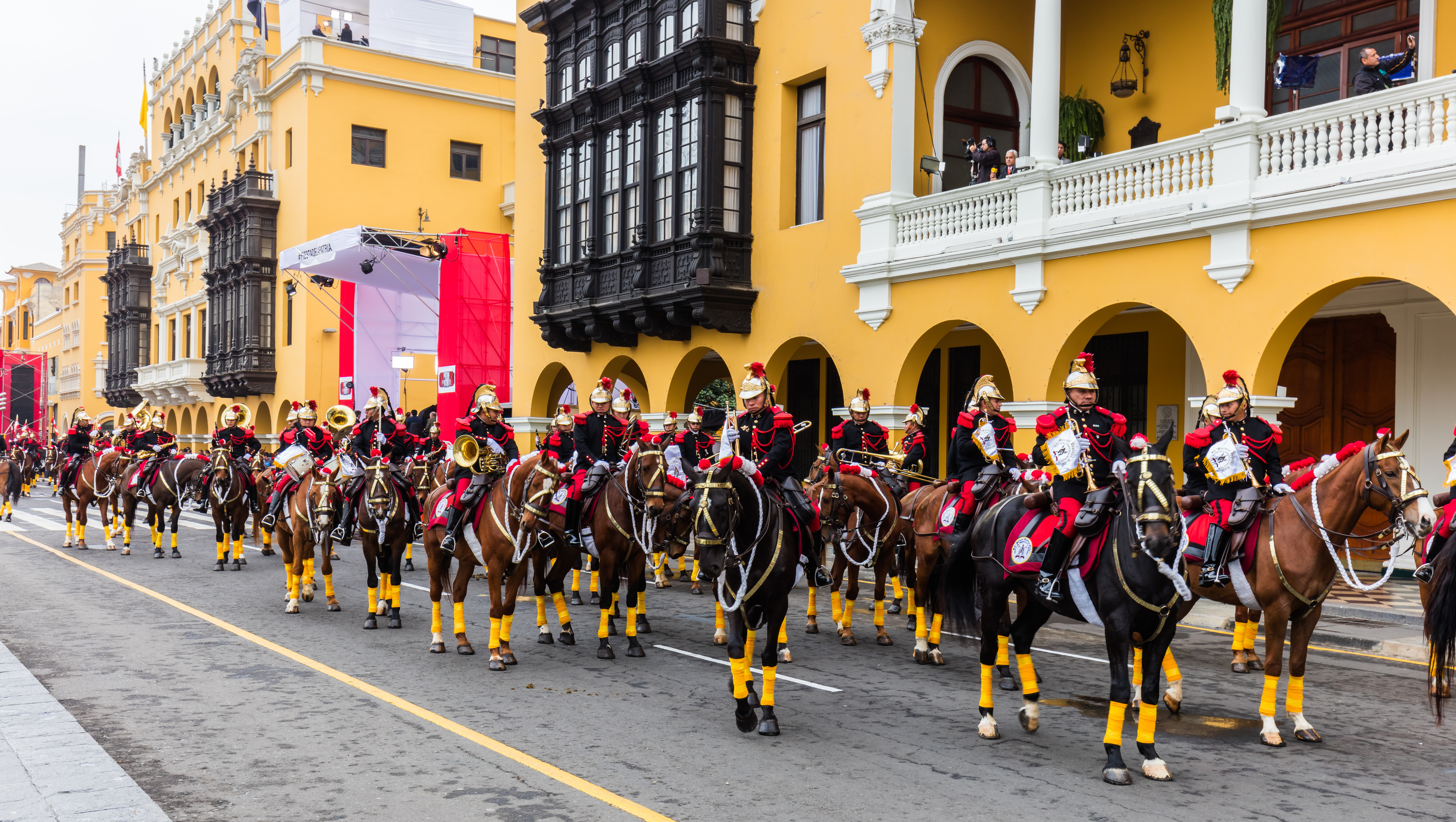
The regiment in the Plaza Mayor in 2015

This Regiment of Dragoons was raised in 1904 following the recommendations of the first French military mission that undertook the Peruvian Army reorganization in 1896. The Dragoon Guards of the "Field Marshal Nieto" Regiment of Cavalry were to Perú what the British Household Cavalry Brigade is to United Kingdom in the 19th century and were fashioned after French dragoon regiments of the late 19th to early 20th centuries, today, upon its reestablishment it is now the Peruvian equivalent, alongside the Hussars of Junín Regiment and the Mounted Squadron of the Corps of Cadets of the Chorrillos Military School, to the Household Cavalry Mounted Regiment. Formerly the Cavalry Squadron "President's Escort" and later a full ceremonial regiment of cavalry, it received its present designation in 1949, named after Field Marshal Domingo Nieto.

At 1.00 p.m. every day, the main esplanade in front of the building and fronting the Main Square, through the years is the venue for the changing of the guard, directed by the Dragoons of the Presidential Guard of mounted infantry, either dismounted or mounted, with the regimental mounted military band, and sometimes in the presence of the President and the First Family. Today, if the President is absent, the Chief of the Presidential Military Staff and on the solemn changing ceremonies on Sundays, members of the Council of Ministers of Peru, takes the salute on the President's behalf.

In 1987 the Peruvian president Alan García did not like the regimental drill, patterned after the French fashion, of the "Field Marshal Domingo Nieto" Regiment of Cavalry, Life-Guard of the President of the Republic of Peru and ordered the 1st Light Cavalry, "Glorious Hussars of Junín" Regiment, Peru's Liberators, to be his life-guard unit and the Hussars of Junín are his Horse Guards ever since until 2012. (The Regiment, as a result, was disbanded that February and was reformed later in Sullana as the 17th Armored Cavalry Regiment.) The Hussars were raised in 1821 by José de San Martín as part of the Peruvian Guard Legion, and fought at the final battles of the Latin American wars of independence in Junín and Ayacucho. Wearing uniforms similar to the Regiment of Mounted Grenadiers "General San Martín", but in red and blue, they carry sabres and lances on parade, both on the ground and while mounted on horses. Their arrival was signaled by the regimental mounted band playing the Triumphial March from Verdi's Aida.

They moved to the Army Education and Doctrine Command in 2012 after 25 years of service, but the regiment still rides to the Palace and in state ceremonial events when needed.

The Marshal Nieto Dragoon Life Guards Escort Cav. Regt. were reactivated by order of President Ollanta Humalla and the Peruvian Ministry of Defense on 2 Feb. 2012, but they are now part of the guards units stationed, thus alternating with the other guards units in the palace grounds beginning from 30 July of the same year onward, and earlier made their return on the annual 29 July Great Military Parade. Their Guard Mounting ceremony happens 2 times a week when dismounted while the mounted version is done only twice a month (1st and 3rd Sundays only).

Aside from presidential security, it is also in charge of providing the guard during state visits to Peru and during state funerals.

== Headquarters ==
Cuartel Barbones
- Barrios Altos, Lima in Peru

Site information
- Owner: Ministry of Defence
- Operator: Peruvian Army
- Controlled by: Mariscal Domingo Nieto Cavalry Regiment Escort; Hussars of Junín

Site history
- Built for: Bethlehemites

Garrison information
- Designations: Cultural heritage of Peru (partial)

Cuartel Barbones, formerly known as the convent of the Bethlehemites and more formally as the Hospital de Indios Convalecientes Nuestra Señora del Carmen, is a military barracks in the district of El Agustino where the Domingo Nieto Cavalry Regiment and the Hussars of Junín are headquartered. In 1991, its "A" section was declared part of the Cultural heritage of Peru by the National Institute of Culture.

The military installation is located just outside the eastern limit of the neighbourhood of Barrios Altos (then known as the "extramuros" area), on the last block of the Jirón Junín that once bore the same name. It was originally the location of a hospital and convent of the Bethlehemite Brothers that was destroyed during the earthquake of 1687. One of the gates (the "Portada de Barbones") of the walls of Lima was located at the end of the street, in what is now Grau Avenue. When the walls were demolished, the area in front of the barracks became known as the Plazuela de Barbones. It took its name from the Bethlehemites' custom of having long beards and the fact that it was their main headquarters during the Viceregal and Republican eras.

A defence building had been built in the area in 1740 by Spanish soldiers, but it was only after the Peruvian War of Independence during the 19th century that it was eventurally converted into a military facility. By the time the War of the Pacific had reached a point where the Chilean Army was on its way to Lima, military units were organised inside the barracks, which were looted and destroyed during the occupation of Lima.

== Dress uniform ==
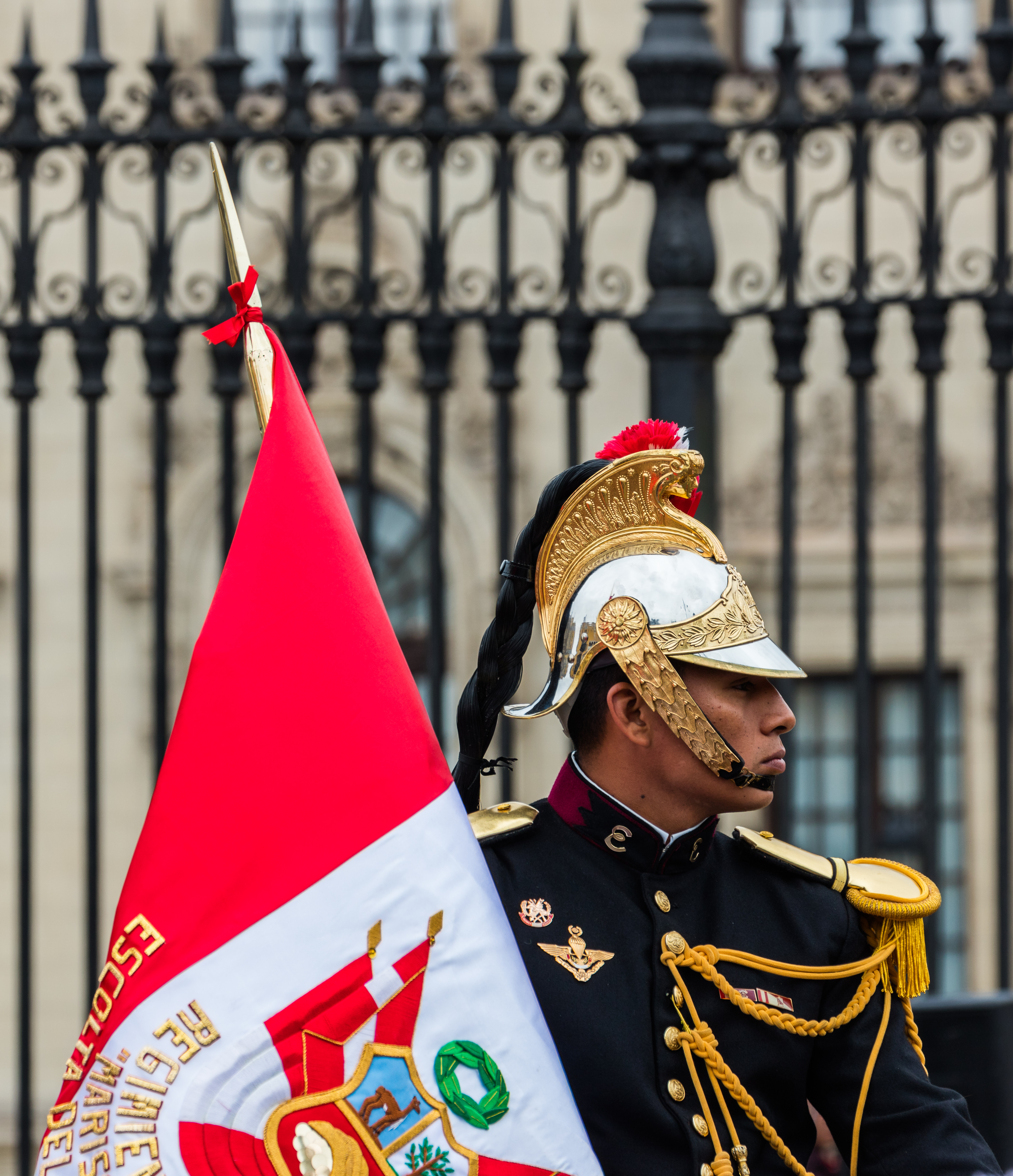
A dragoon soldier in dress uniform

Their full dress uniforms include either white tunics (in the summer) or black tunics (in the winter,) worn with red breeches all year around. Also worn are epaulettes (gold for officers and red for NCOs and enlisted personnel), similar to the French practice, and a bronze metal helmet with the coat of arms of Peru. Formerly the dragoons were armed with sabres, lances, and the FN FAL rifle, one of the standard issue rifles used by the Peruvian Army. Today, however they are equipped with lances and sabers only.

== See also ==
- Peruvian Army
