= Battle of Quillagua =

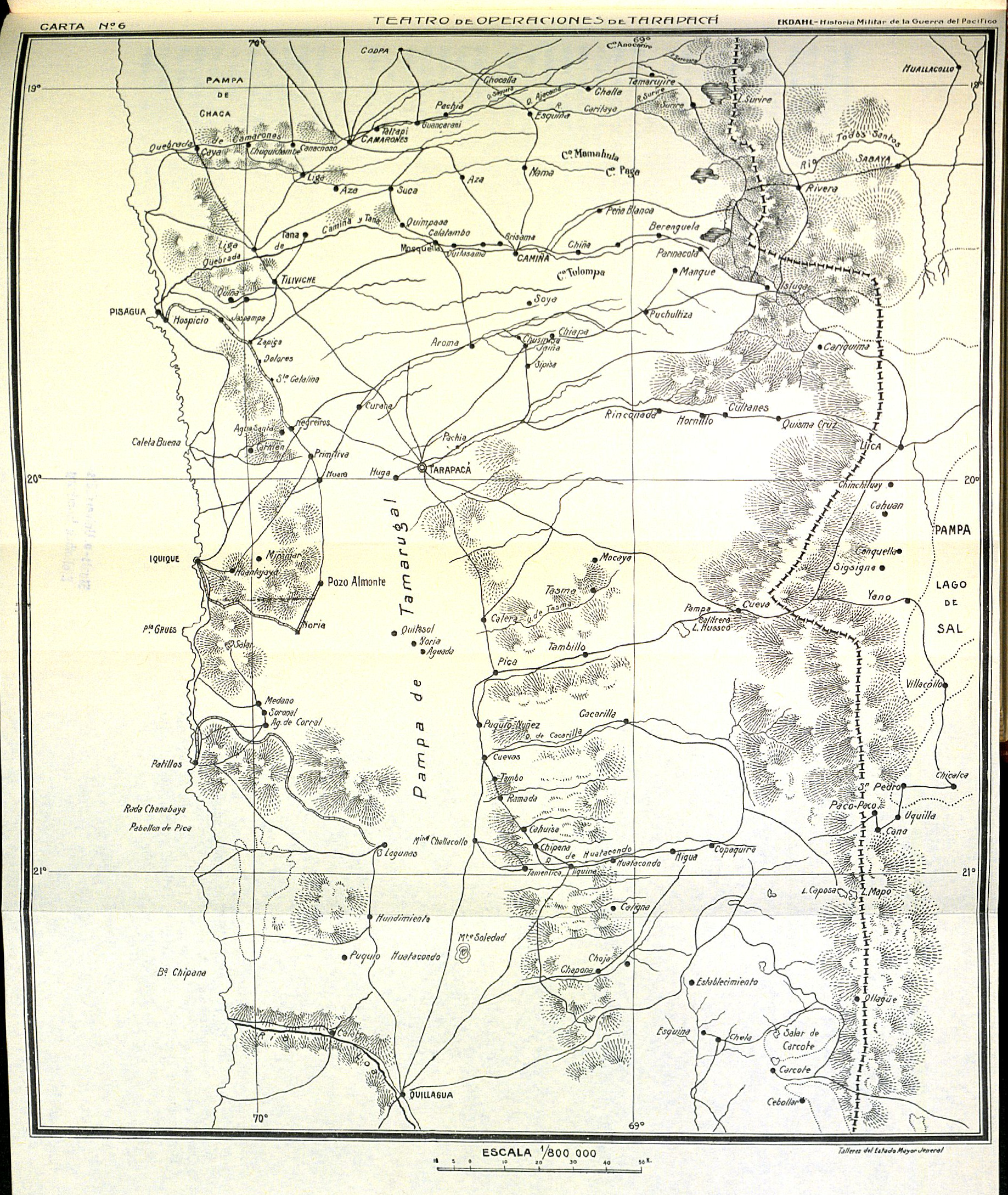
Date	October 10, 1879
Location	Quillagua, Tarapacá Department, Peru 21.619834°S 69.606315°W
Result	Peruvian victory

Belligerents
Peru	Chile

Commanders and leaders
Belisario Suárez	Belisario Amor (surrendered); Norberto Munilla †

Strength
32 Hussars of Junín	30 Cazadores a Caballo

Casualties and losses
1 injured	2 killed, 1 wounded, 9 captured
- Location within Chile Battle of Quillagua (South America) Battle of Quillagua (America)

The Battle of Quillagua was a battle of the War of the Pacific that occurred on October 10, 1879. It was the first ever land battle between the Peruvian and Chilean infantry.

== Background ==
After the Battle of Topáter and the occupation of Calama, the Chilean troops had taken possession of the entire Bolivian coastline. They had some minor encounters with the Bolivian civilian resistance in the area, the last of which had been near the Salado River. Here, with the death of their two main caudillos, the Bolivian guerrillas were defeated. The authority of the Chilean military was strengthened up to the Loa River, which had constituted the old border between Peru and Bolivia. This strategically important place was the "Loa Line", where the Chilean command established an advance camp in Quillagua. Quillagua was at that time a small Peruvian village located near the Loa River on the road to Calama, which the correspondent of the Bulletin of the War of the Pacific described as "a village of 77 inhabitants through whose way they could traffic wagons at half load."

After leaving Pozo Almonte on October 5, the Peruvian cavalry marched through San Pedro de Atacama to Aguada de la Alianza where the Tamarugal desert began. That same afternoon, Belisario Suárez and his hussars arrived at the Pozos de la Soledad where they stopped one day studying the place and preparing a report for the general staff. Understanding the need to examine the Chilean camp of Quillagua, Colonel Suárez took 32 of his hussars and headed down the Remesas road. Following the course of the Loa River, in the early morning of the 10th, the Peruvian column arrived half a league from the Chilean camp of Quillagua where the Peruvian cavalry proceeded to charge towards the camp accompanied by a shot from a reckless soldier thereby giving the alarm to the Chilean troops stationed in the place and made up mainly of the Santiago infantry regiment, a 1350-seater fort, and a detachment of the Cazadores a Caballo cavalry regiment.

== The Battle ==
With the Chilean camp on arms, the Peruvian cavalry withdrew being pursued by a squad of 30 horsemen from Cazadores a Caballo under the command of Lieutenant Belisario Amor, under the cover of the dense fog, Suárez's squad reached the Tambillo pampa where his rearguard exchanged some shots with the Chilean horsemen. Faced with the impossibility of continuing the retreat due to the tiredness of the horses, Suárez ordered to dismount. his men and deployed in guerrilla warfare under the cover of a nearby hill from which they opened fire on their pursuers, thereby making them retreat as well. A new attempt to chase another Chilean party was also repelled, with the replacement of the horses, Colonel Suárez was able to continue in the direction of Soledad, where he arrived at around three in the afternoon of the 10th.

Upon entering the mount, the Peruvian horsemen were surprised by the shots of an ambush party of the Desert Explorers squadron. Given the suddenness of the attack, Colonel Suárez ordered his hussars to be deployed in battle and charged on enemy shooters hidden in the Tamarugos forest, whom he managed to disperse after a short combat, capturing 9 prisoners and the seizing of 11 horses, 10 sabers and 10 remington carbines. In the forest, 2 dead and one wounded were also found, which was medicated in the best way that the circumstances and the means allowed. On the Peruvian casualties, Ensign Moyano was bruised, who fell from his horse during the impetuous charge.

After this action, the Peruvian advance withdrew to Lagunas, returning later to La Noria, after being interrogated, the Chilean prisoners were confined in Iquique along with the sailors of the corvette Esmeralda that Miguel Grau had saved after the combat in Iquique, all of whom would be released. when the Chilean squadron occupied the port on November 23 before the withdrawal of the Ríos Division, which marched to join the Peruvian army stationed in Tarapacá.

The list of prisoners captured during the battle were: First Sergeant Norberto Munilla, first corporal Eusebio Cordero, first corporal: José S. Aliaga, first corporal: Hilario Arrieta, second corporal José del D. Avendaño, soldier Vicente Núñez, soldier: Miguel Campo, soldier Gregorio Miranda, soldier Próspero Alavarez, soldier Eusebio Rojas.
