= Battle of Junín =

1824 battle of the Peruvian War of Independence

- Part of the Peruvian War of Independence
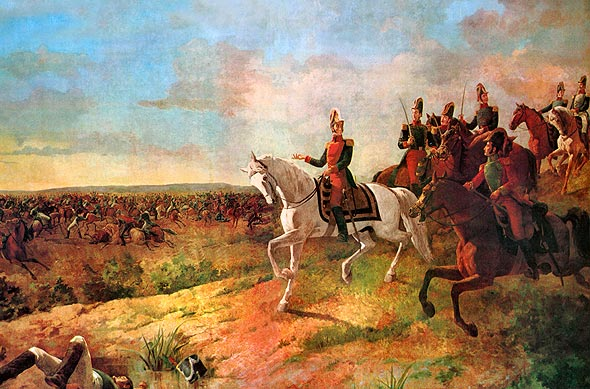
- Battle of Junín by Martín Tovar y Tovar. Oil on canvas.
Date	6 August 1824
Location	Junín Region
Result	Patriot victory

Belligerents
Peru; Gran Colombia	Spain

Commanders and leaders
(Gran Colombia) Simón Bolívar (Gran Colombia) Antonio José de Sucre	(Spain) José de Canterac

Strength
1,000 men	1,300 men

Casualties and losses
150 killed	250 killed

The Battle of Junín was a large cavalry engagement of the Peruvian War of Independence, fought in the highlands of the Junín Region on 6 August 1824. The preceding February the royalists had regained control of Lima, and having regrouped in Trujillo, Simón Bolívar in June led his rebel forces south to confront the Spanish under Field Marshal José de Canterac. The two armies met on the Plain of Junín in the Bombon Plateau, northwest of the Jauja Valley.

== Battle ==
Bolivar sent some 8,000 soldiers, in a hurry to try to cut the royalist retreat towards Cusco, also with a force 8,000 soldiers. Bolivar also sent out his 1,000-strong cavalry to delay the movement of Spanish troops out of the Plain of Junín. The Spanish sent out their cavalry of some 1,300 riders to disrupt the incoming patriot cavalry to give Canterac time to withdraw his infantry from the plain. The plain is a marshland close to Junín Lake at around 4,100 meters over sea level.

The patriot troops were trying to arrange for battle when they were struck by the charge of the Spanish cavalry and sent back in confusion. The Spanish charge first hit the squadron of Colombian Grenadiers under General Necochea and including Mayor Otto Felipe Braun as one of its commanders, which managed to contain the charge the Spanish cavalry, stopping at moments such attack. General Miller, in command of 250 Hussars of Peru, was tasked with outflanking the right of Canterac's cavalry, but was unable to execute the orders by the surprising Spanish attack and had to charge frontally, being thrown into the melee with the Andes Grenadiers and the Hussar of Colombia. General Necochea was wounded and made prisoner, only part of the Grenadiers of Colombia, under the command of Mayor Braun, managed to breach the enemy's lines, being in an advantageous position while the bulk of the patriot's cavalry was in disorderly retreat. Witnessing such critical moment, General Bolivar, who was overlooking the imminent defeat from a hill, retreated to the rearguard to accelerate the march of the infantry.

At that moment, all Spanish squads in pursue of the enemy taken for defeated, lost the initial compact formation and did not notice that the First Squad of Hussars of Peru, under the command of Lieutenant Colonel Isidoro Suarez, had not yet entered the battle, hidden behind a hill in the battlefield. Colonel Suarez and his squad were waiting for orders while observing the exposed left flank of the Spanish, when he received a communication from Mayor Jose Andres Razuri, letting know of a false order purportedly given by General La Mar, to charge the Spanish cavalry in pursue of the patriot's cavalry. Lieutenant Colonel Suarez ordered the charge and the Spanish were taken completely by surprise, being horribly butchered. Seeing the new twist in the melee, the bulk of the patriot cavalry, under the command of General Miller replacing captured General Necochea, returned to the battle. The action of Coronel Silva managed to reorganize the Hussars of Colombia, avoiding being completely surrounded by the Spanish.

[translated from Spanish] The independentists had already been overwhelmed; Despite their courage and determination, they had not been able to resist the terrible impulse of the royalists' cavalry; They were already beginning to sing the hymn of victory when two enemy squadrons that were in the rear under the command of Lieutenant Colonel Suarez, threw themselves on the victors who were also in the greatest disorder and confusion mixed with the defeated. Joining them with that mass of bronze that was in perfect formation, they fell again on the scattered royalists, stabbed them horribly, forced them to retreat quickly, and took the battlefield from them.

— Spanish historian Mariano Torrente

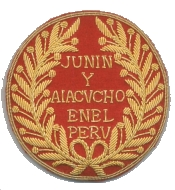
Patch awarded to officers who took part of the Peruvian Campaign in 1823–24.

Attacked in the exposed flank and in the rear, the Spanish lost morale and retreated in a disorderly way. This development in the battle, unbeknownst to General Canterac, did not let him understand the sudden and unexpected change, not finding a reasoning for such disband, as he informed later to the Viceroy of Peru, José de la Serna e Hinojosa. Thrown to the open land, the Spanish were completely defeated. The patriotic infantry regiments, which Bolivar had just ordered to march into the battlefield from the rearguard, arrived when the fight had ended.

Solely a cavalry battle, it lasted about 45 minutes and involved hand-to-hand cavalry clashes with lance and saber, with no firearms used. About 250 royalist and 150 pro-independence fighters were killed.

The battle of Junín was one of the greatest episodes of the Peruvian War of Independence, compared by many historians to other battles such as Copiapo or Boyaca. The victory, which meant the destruction of the dominant Spanish Cavalry, which lost over 400 horses taken by the patriots, greatly enhanced the morale of the victorious pro-independence fighters, with a first win in Peru. The retreat of Canterac's troops after the defeat in Junin was relentless and defections from the Spanish royalist troops to the patriots increased considerably. Eventually De la Serna, had to step in as commander of the Spanish forces to try to restore morale.

The patriot victory paved the way for a final triumph over the Spanish, after the Peruvian Independence was proclaimed 3 years before, on 28 July 1821. The final Spanish capitulation would come after the Battle of Ayacucho, on 9 December 1824, when the then commander of Spanish forces, Viceroy de la Serna, finally surrendered to the patriot forces, ending the Spanish domination over South America.

Mayor Jose Andres Razuri was later reprimanded by General Jose de la Mar for inventing an order given by Bolivar, saying, "You should be executed, but today's victory is owed to you". The actions of Razuri and the First Squad of Hussars of Peru are widely considered as the most determinant in the outcome of the Battle of Junín. Bolivar highly praised the regiment of Hussars of Peru for their action in reverting the fate of the battle, renaming them Hussars of Junín, as they are known thereafter.

== Post-battle debriefing note by General Santa Cruz, Chief of Staff, mentioning the outstanding officers ==
[translated from Spanish]

[omitted paragraphs]

Your Excellency the Liberator, witness of the heroic courage of the braves who distinguished themselves yesterday, recommends to the admiration of America, General Necochea, who threw himself into the enemy ranks with heroic impetuosity, until receiving seven wounds, Mr. General Miller, who with the first regiment of Peru flanked the enemy with great skill and boldness: Mr. Colonel Carvajal, who killed many enemies with his lance; Mr. Colonel Silva, who in the midst of the confusion of the combat regrouped part of his body, which was in disorder and rejected the squadrons that surrounded him: Mr. Colonel Bruix, who with Captain Pringles, some officers and Grenadiers of the Andes, stood firm in the midst of dangers: the Commander of the first squadron of the cavalry regiment of the Peruvian line, Suarez, who led his body with the skill and resolution that will always honor the braves of Peru: Commander Sowersby, of the second squadron, who was seriously ill, threw himself into enemy lances until receiving a wound: Commander Blanco, from the third squad: Major Olavarría and Captain Allende, from the first squad of the same regiment: the brave Commander Medina, Aide of Your Excellency: Captain Camacaro, from Hussars of Colombia, who with his company took the backs of the enemy squadrons and cut off the flight of his instant triumph: Captains Escobar and Sandoval, from Grenadiers; and to Captains Jiménez and Peraza, of Hussars of Colombia: Lieutenants Segovia and Tapia, and Sub-Lieutenant Lanza, who with Major Braun pursued the enemy squadrons towards their infantry.

[omitted paragraphs]

— Daniel Florencio O'Leary

== The Battle of Junín in literature ==
- Ecuadorian poet José Joaquín de Olmedo, from Guayaquil, wrote a poem about the battle.
- Argentinean writer Jorge Luis Borges wrote a poem about his ancestor, Manuel Isidoro Suarez, who led the First Squad of Hussars of Peru at Junin.
