= Reconquista (Spanish America) =

Period of restored Spanish rule after 1814

In the struggle for the independence of Spanish America, the Reconquista refers to the period of Colombian and Chilean history, following the defeat of Napoleon in 1814, during which royalist armies were able to gain the upper hand in the Spanish American wars of independence. The term used in the past century by some Colombian and Chilean historians makes an analogy to the medieval Reconquista, in which Christian forces retook the Iberian Peninsula from the Caliphate.

During Napoleon's invasion of the Iberian Peninsula, a number of Spanish colonies in the Americas moved for greater autonomy or outright independence due to the political instability in Spain, which was eventually (1810) governed by the Cortes of Cádiz – which served as a democratic Regency after Ferdinand VII was deposed.

By 1815 the general outlines of which areas were controlled by royalists and pro-independence forces had been established and the situation had reached a stalemate. With the exception of rural areas controlled by guerrillas, New Spain and Peru was under the control of royalists, and in South America only the Río de la Plata and New Granada remained outside of royalist control. After French forces left Spain in 1814, the restored Ferdinand VII, declared these developments in the Americas illegal, abolished the Spanish Constitution of 1812 passed by the Cortes of Cádiz, then sent expeditionary armies to quell the remaining rebellions. The impact of these expeditions was most notable in Pablo Morillo's expedition against New Granada, and Venezuela. The restoration of royal rule was short lived, reversed in these three countries.

== Restoration of Ferdinand VII ==
The restoration of Ferdinand VII signified an important change, since most of the political and legal changes done on both sides of the Atlantic—the myriad of juntas, the Cortes of Cádiz and several of the congresses in the Americas, and many of the constitutions and new legal codes—had been done in his name. Once in Spain he realized that he had significant support from conservatives in the general population and the hierarchy of the Spanish Catholic Church, and so on May 4, he repudiated the Spanish Constitution of 1812, then on May 10 ordered the arrest of liberal leaders who had created it. Ferdinand justified his actions by stating that the Constitution and other changes had been made by a Cortes assembled in his absence and without his consent. He also declared all of the juntas and constitutions written in Spanish America invalid and restored the former law codes and political institutions. News of the events arrived through Spanish America during the next three weeks to nine months, depending on time it took goods and people to travel from Spain.

This, in effect, constituted a definitive break with two groups that could have been allies of Ferdinand VII: the autonomous governments, which had not yet declared formal independence, and Spanish liberals who had created a representative government that would fully include the overseas possessions and was seen as an alternative to independence by many in New Spain, Central America, the Caribbean, Quito (today Ecuador), Peru, Upper Peru (today, Bolivia) and Chile. Most Spanish Americans were moderates who decided to wait and see what would come out of the restoration of normalcy. Spanish Americans in royalist areas who were committed to independence had already joined guerrilla movements. Ferdinand's actions did set areas outside of the control of the royalist armies on the path to full independence. The governments of these regions, which had their origins in the juntas of 1810—and even moderates there who had entertained a reconciliation with the crown—now saw the need to separate from Spain, if they were to protect the reforms they had enacted.

== Expeditionary campaigns ==
During this period royalist forces made advances into New Granada, which they controlled from 1815 to 1819, and into Chile, from 1814 to 1817. Except for royalist areas in the northeast and south, the provinces of New Granada had maintained independence from Spain since 1810, unlike neighboring Venezuela, where royalists and pro-independence forces had exchanged control of the country several times. To pacify Venezuela and to retake New Granada, Spain organized and sent in 1815 the largest armed force it ever sent to the New World, consisting of approximately 10,000 troops and nearly sixty ships under the command of general Pablo Morillo. Although this force was crucial in retaking a solidly pro-independence region like New Granada, its soldiers were eventually spread out throughout Venezuela, New Granada, Quito and Peru and lost to tropical diseases, diluting their impact on the war. Ultimately, the majority of the royalist forces were composed, not of soldiers sent from Spain, but of Spanish Americans.

=== The expeditionary army of Tierra Firme ===
Leaving the port of Cádiz on February 17, 1815, the force initially landed at Carupano (Venezuela) in April and later invaded the island of Margarita where no resistance was encountered. After leaving the island, Morillo's troops reinforced existing royalist forces in the Venezuelan mainland, entering Cumaná, La Guaira, Caracas, and Puerto Cabello in May. A small part of the main corps set off towards Panama, while the main contingent was directed towards the Neogranadine coastal city of Santa Marta which was still in royalist hands.

After picking up supplies and militia volunteers in Santa Marta on July 23, the Spanish expeditionary forces besieged Cartagena de Indias. After a five-month siege the fortified city fell in December 1815. By May 6, 1816, the combined efforts of Spanish and colonial forces, marching south from Cartagena and north from royalist strongholds in Quito, Pasto, and Popayán, completed the reconquest of New Granada, taking Bogotá. A permanent council of war was set up to judge those accused of treason and rebellion, resulting in the execution of more than a hundred notable republican officials, including Jorge Tadeo Lozano, Francisco José de Caldas and José María Cabal. Units of the republican armies of New Granada were incorporated into the royalist army and sent to Peru.

=== The Chilean campaign ===
In August 1814 the Queen's Talavera Regiment, a unit which had fought in the Peninsular War, arrived in Talcahuano, a royalist bastion in Chile under the command of Brigadier Mariano Osorio, who was also the newly appointed governor. Osorio succeeded in organizing local recruits into a mobile army of some 5,000 men, of which the troops of the Talaveras Regiment were practically the only Spaniards. The new royalist force fought the patriot forces on October 1 in Rancagua, in which the patriots unsuccessfully tried to stop the expeditionaries from taking Santiago.

After royalist forces took Santiago, patriots found in the city—among whom were members of the First Junta—were exiled to the Juan Fernández Islands. By November Spanish control had been reestablished in most of Chile. A member of the Talavera Regiment, Vicente San Bruno was put in charge of carrying out the orders to arrest civilians suspected of having helped or sympathised with the patriots. In 1816 Francisco Marcó del Pont became the new governor and he initiated a new campaign of fierce political and military persecution. Marcó del Pont appointed San Bruno president of a Tribunal of Vigilance and Public Security.

=== The royalist military ===
Overall, Europeans formed only about a tenth of the royalist armies in Spanish America, and only about half of the expeditionary units once they were deployed in the Americas. Since each European soldier casualty was substituted by a Spanish American soldier, over time, there were more and more Spanish American soldiers in the expeditionary units. For example Pablo Morillo, commander in chief of the expeditionary force sent South America, reported that he only had 2,000 European soldiers under his command in 1820, in other words, only half of the soldiers of his expeditionary force were European. It is estimated that in the Battle of Maipú only a quarter of the royalist forces were European soldiers, in the Battle of Carabobo about a fifth, and in the Battle of Ayacucho less than 1% was European.

The American militias reflected the racial make-up of the local population. For example, in 1820 the royalist army in Venezuela had 843 white (español), 5,378 Casta and 980 Indigenous soldiers.

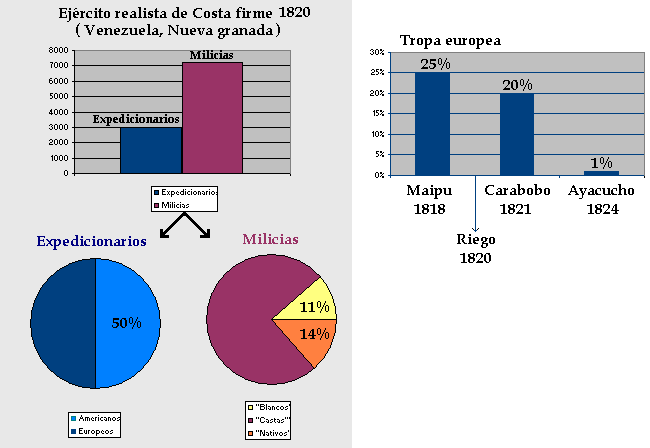
Royalist army

== Reverses ==
Far from pacifying the patriots, these actions served to incite them to the military solution, and soon even moderates, who had previously envisioned a negotiation with the Spanish crown, concluded that war of independence was the only way to guarantee their newfound freedoms.

In New Granada, patriots reacted to the expeditionary force with disunity, aiding Morillo's advance. Several Neogranadine and Venezuelan exiles fled to Haiti, where they were well received. Others fled to the Llanos, where they were out of reach of Morillo's forces. Haitian president Alexandre Pétion gave the exiles military and monetary aid, which allowed them to resume the struggle for independence in conjunction with the patriots who had organized the Llaneros into guerrilla bands.

In the Southern Cone, San Martín as the governor of Cuyo, had been organizing an army as early as 1814 in preparation for an invasion of Chile. Chilean patriots who escaped the royalist reprisals fled to Mendoza, an Argentine Andean province under Buenos Aires control. They were reorganized under José de San Martín. While Argentinean forces prepared to invade Chile, San Martín and O'Higgins initiated a guerrilla campaign under Manuel Rodríguez to keep the royalist forces off balance. The black people, slave and freemen, recruits from Mendoza and Buenos Aires was the nucleus of the Army of the Andes, which received crucial political and material support in 1816 when Juan Martín de Pueyrredón became Supreme Director of the United Provinces. From January to February 1817, San Martín led the Army over the Andes in an audacious move that turned the tables on the royalists in Chile. By February 10, San Martín had control of northern and central Chile, and a year later had control of the south. Chile was secured from royalist control and independence was declared in 1818. San Martín and his allies spent the next two years planning an invasion of Peru, which began in 1820.

In northern South America, Simón Bolívar devised a change the center of military operations from Caracas to New Granada. Like San Martín, Bolívar personally undertook the efforts to create an army to invade a neighboring country and collaborated with pro-independence exiles from that region. Unlike San Martín, Bolívar did not have the approval of the Venezuelan congress. From June to July 1819, using the rainy season as cover, Bolívar led an army composed mostly of Llaneros and British Legions over the cold, forbidding passes of the Andes, but the gamble paid off. By August Bolívar was in control of Bogotá and gained the support of New Granada, which still resented the harsh reconquest carried out under Morillo. With the resources of New Granada, Bolívar became the undisputed leader of the patriots in Venezuela and orchestrated the union of the two regions in a new state, Gran Colombia.

== See also ==
- Spanish attempts to reconquer Mexico
- Spanish annexation of the Dominican Republic
- Spain and the American Civil War
- Spanish reconquest of Santo Domingo
- United Kingdom of Ecuador, Peru and Bolivia
- Venezuelan War of Independence

== Bibliography ==
- Timothy Anna. Spain & the Loss of Empire. Lincoln, University of Nebraska Press, 1983. ISBN 978-0-8032-1014-1
- Christon I. Archer (ed.). The Wars of Independence in Spanish America. Willmington, SR Books, 2000. ISBN 0-8420-2469-7
- Michael P. Costeloe. Response to Revolution: Imperial Spain and the Spanish American Revolutions, 1810-1840. Cambridge University Press, 1986. ISBN 978-0-521-32083-2
- Jorge I. Domínguez. Insurrection or Loyalty: The Breakdown of the Spanish American Empire. Cambridge, Harvard University Press, 1980. ISBN 978-0-674-45635-8
- Rebecca Earle. Spain and the Independence of Colombia, 1810-1825. Exter: University of Exter Press, 2000. ISBN 0-85989-612-9
- Jaime E. Rodríguez O. The Independence of Spanish America. Cambridge University Press, 1998. ISBN 0-521-62673-0
- Stephen K. Stoan. Pablo Morillo and Venezuela, 1815-1820. Columbus: Ohio State University Press, 1959.
