= Crossing of the Andes =

Feat in the South American wars of independence

- Part of the Spanish American wars of independence
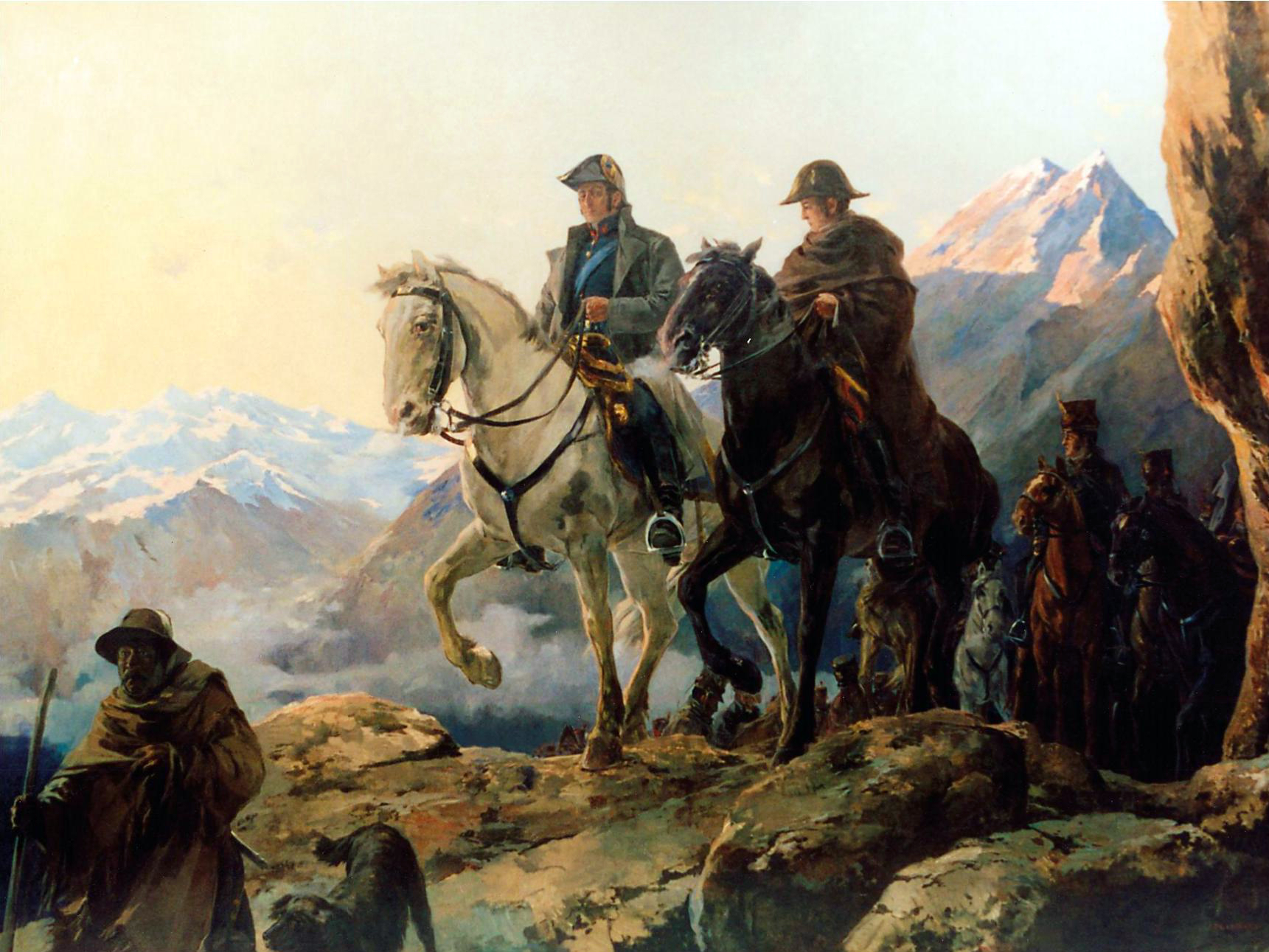
- General San Martin and General O'Higgins leading the crossing of the Andes, painting by Julio Vila y Prades.
Date	January 19 to February 13, 1817
Location	From Argentina to Chile
Result	Argentine—Chilean victory: Independence of Chile; San Martín continues with his plan to reach Lima by sea.

Belligerents
Patriots: United Provinces; Army of the Andes; Chilean patriots	Royalists: Spain; Captaincy General of Chile

Commanders and leaders
José de San Martín; Miguel Estanislao Soler; Bernardo O'Higgins	Francisco Marcó del Pont; Mariano Osorio

The Crossing of the Andes (Spanish: Cruce de los Andes) was one of the most important feats in the Argentine and Chilean wars of independence. A combined army of Argentine soldiers and Chilean exiles crossed the Andes mountains (which separate Argentina from Chile) to invade Chile, leading to its liberation from Spanish rule.

Led by General José de San Martín and departing from Mendoza—then part of the Province of Cuyo, Argentina—in January 1817, the successful crossing took 21 days. The army navigated heights averaging 3,000 meters. The feat has been compared to Hannibal's and Napoleon's crossings of the Alps and is considered one of the greatest achievements of its kind in military history.

== Background ==
The crossing of the Andes was a key part of the strategy devised by General José de San Martín to defeat the royalist forces at their stronghold in Lima, Viceroyalty of Peru, and to secure the Spanish American independence movements. The idea of crossing the Andes had been developed earlier by secret lodges advocating for South American independence and was part of the Maitland Plan, designed by Thomas Maitland. San Martín became aware of this plan during his brief stay in Britain before sailing to South America. After realizing the difficulties of attacking the royalist stronghold of Lima through Upper Peru, he decided to implement this plan.

The Captaincy General of Chile had removed its governor in 1810 and replaced him with the First Government Junta, marking the beginning of a period in Chilean history known as Patria Vieja. However, they were defeated in 1814 at the Battle of Rancagua, and during the subsequent Reconquista, Chile once again became a royalist stronghold. Bernardo O'Higgins and other Chilean leaders fled to Mendoza during the new royalist regime, and O'Higgins later became a key figure in the Army of the Andes alongside the Argentine soldiers.

== Troops and equipment ==
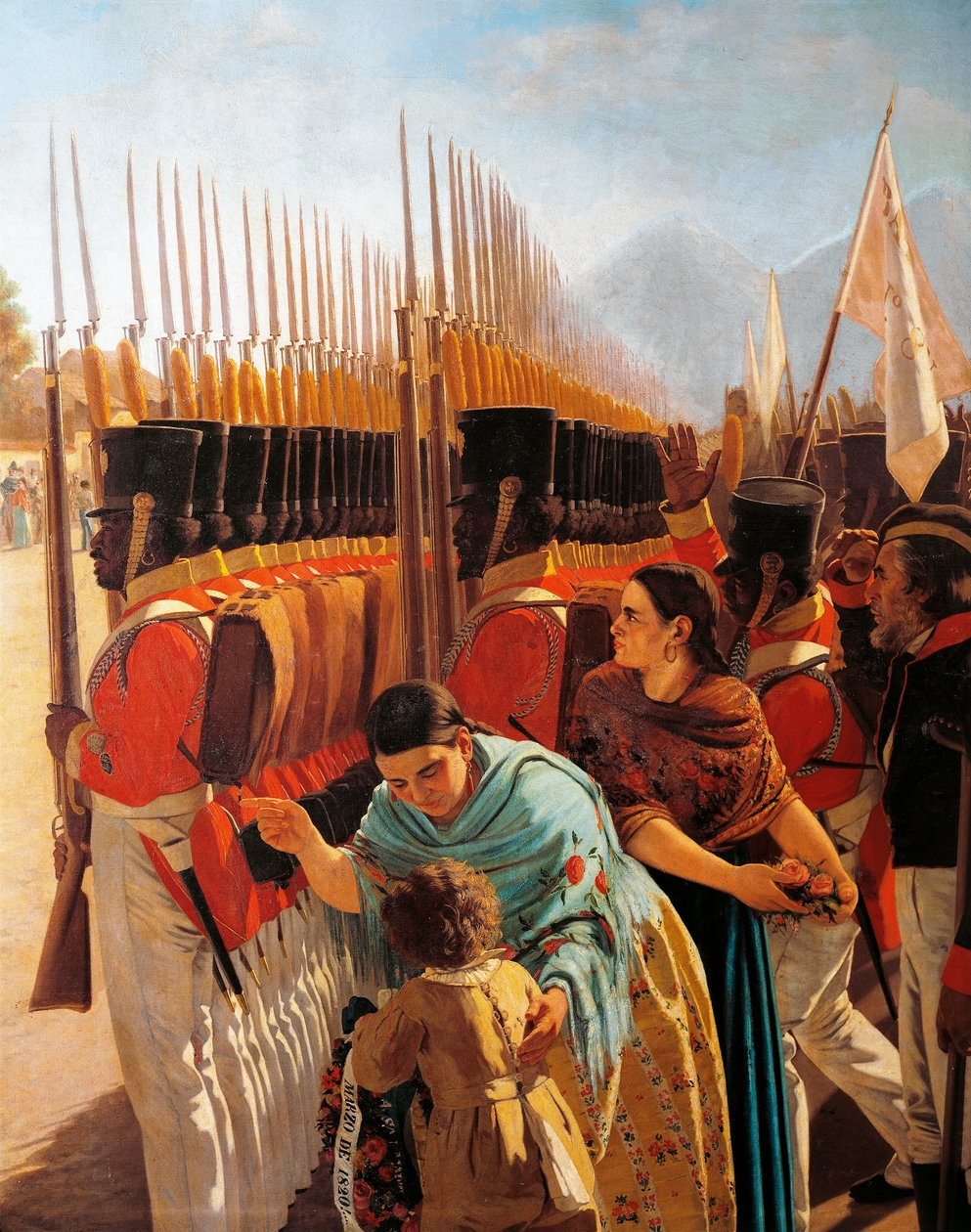
Patriot troops being inspected before the crossing

During this period, the city of Mendoza became a crucial headquarters for the preparations before the crossing. The citizens of Mendoza supported the troops by manufacturing gunpowder and ammunition, and they even learned to make cannons.

The main food supply for the army was a regional dish called valdiviano, prepared with dried meat or charqui, sliced raw onion, potatoes, and boiling water. The army had designated soldiers responsible for transporting food. These soldiers carried forty tons of charqui, maize cakes, meat, brandy to combat the nighttime cold, garlic and onion to stimulate appetite, over 4,000 cattle for the remainder of the campaign, as well as cheese and rum.

== The crossing ==
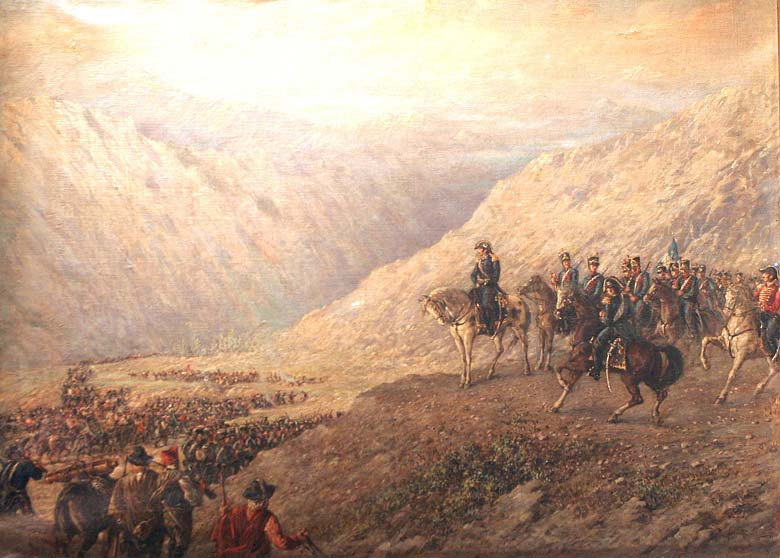
The Liberator José de San Martín and his army during their passage through the Andes Mountains.

On the morning of January 19, 1817, San Martín and his army set out from their base camp, El Plumerillo, and began their journey across the Andes mountain range. San Martín crossed with 4,000 men, though he ultimately lost one-third of them during the trek. The number of auxiliaries reached 1,200.

To manage the crossing, San Martín divided his army into two groups. The main division, which traveled through the Pass of Los Patos, was led by San Martín, Miguel Estanislao Soler, and Bernardo O'Higgins. The secondary division, which took the more southerly Uspallata Pass, was led by Juan Gregorio de Las Heras.

== Conclusion ==
On February 13, 1817, San Martín, O'Higgins, and their army successfully entered Santiago, Chile, after crossing 500 kilometers of mountain range. By this time, the royalist forces had advanced north to avoid San Martín's army, but one royalist leader remained behind with 1,500 men at a valley called Chacabuco, near Santiago. This led to the Battle of Chacabuco.

== Legacy ==
In 2010, the Argentine and Chilean armies recreated the crossing during the bicentennial celebrations of the Revolution.

== See also ==
- Argentina–Chile relations
- Revolución: el cruce de los Andes
