= Father Cigarette =

Father Cigarette may refer to:

- Father Cigarette (1946 film), a 1946 Chilean comedy film
- Father Cigarette (1955 film), a 1955 Spanish-Portuguese comedy film
