= Vicente San Bruno =

Spanish military officer

Vicente San Bruno Rovira (died April 12, 1817) was a Spanish military officer, who fought in the Chilean War of Independence.

== Military career ==
Vicente San Bruno was born in Aragon, and in his youth he took minor order in a Franciscan convent. In 1808, San Bruno left the convent and joined the Spanish army as a soldier at the time of the French invasions. He fought bravely during the Peninsular War and won a promotion to officer. On December 25, 1813, he set sail for Peru under the command of Rafael Maroto as a captain in the Queen's Talavera Regiment. They disembarked at Callao on April 24, 1814, to support Viceroy José Fernando de Abascal y Sousa, who had been working arduously to maintain his viceroyalty and the bordering territories under Spanish control. Maroto and his troops, which included San Bruno, were placed under the orders of Brigadier Mariano Osorio and sent to Chile, which had risen in rebellion after the French invasion of Spain.

=== In Chile ===
San Bruno and the Talavera Regiment embarked on July 19, 1814, arriving at the naval base of Talcahuano, the nucleus of royalist activity, on August 13. Brigadier Osorio succeeded in organizing local elements into a mobile army of some 5,000 men, of which the troops of the Talavera Regiment were practically the only Spaniards. This circumstance led the Talavera Regiment to manifest a marked disdain for its opponents and the Criollo troops in general, typical of Peninsulares recently arrived in the Americas.

On October 1, the two sides fought in Rancagua, an attempt to prevent the expeditionaries from taking Santiago. The Talavera attacked the enemy fortifications without bothering to send in either scouts or guerrillas. The result was that bombarded by the volley of shots, they were forced to retreat with heavy losses. Nevertheless, by November Spanish control had been reestablished, and San Bruno was put in charge of carrying out the orders of imprisoning the civilians suspected of having helped or sympathised with the independentists. On February 6, 1815, he became infamous when he opened the doors of the public jail of Santiago, and when the prisoners came out, had them all killed under the pretext that they were trying to escape.

After Francisco Marcó del Pont became Royal Governor, San Bruno acquired almost unlimited authority. Two of the squadrons of the Talavera Regiment were sent back to Perú, but San Bruno stayed in Chile as commander of the remaining squadron. On January 17, 1816, he was named president of the Court of Vigilance and Public Security, which acted as secret political police. As such he instituted a reign of terror in order to quash any possible rebellion.

== Death ==
San Bruno was captured during the Battle of Chacabuco, which took place on February 12, 1817, while he was trying to organize the resistance. He was taken to Santiago, where the populace tried to lynch him. The victors refused to treat him as a prisoner of war, and he was instead tried as a common criminal on March 6, sentenced to death on April 10 and executed on the main square of Santiago on April 12.

== Additional information ==
=== See also ===
- Chilean War of Independence
- Francisco Marcó del Pont
- Mariano Osorio
- Rafael Maroto
- Antonio de Quintanilla
- Juan Francisco Meneses

=== Sources ===
- Barros Arana, Diego (1855). Historia Jeneral de la Independencia de Chile (in Spanish). Vol. I–IV. Santiago, Chile: Imprenta del Ferrocarril.
- Barros Arana, Diego (1884–1902). Historia Jeneral de Chile (in Spanish). Vol. I–XVI. Santiago, Chile: Rafael Jover. ISBN 9780598482358.
- Castedo, Leopoldo (1954). Resumen de la Historia de Chile de Francisco Antonio Encina (in Spanish). Vol. 2. Santiago, Chile: Empresa Editora Zig-Zag.
- Encina, Francisco Antonio (1940–1952). Historia de Chile: desde la prehistoria hasta 1891 (in Spanish). Vol. I–XX. Santiago, Chile: Editorial Nascimento.
- Gay, Claudio (1856). Historia de la Independencia Chilena (in Spanish). Vol. I & II. Paris, France: Imprenta de E. Thunot y Cia.
- Zapiola, José (1872–1876). Recuerdos de treinta años (1810-1840) (in Spanish). Vol. I & II. Santiago, Chile: Imprenta de El Independiente. p. 310.
