= Refuge Abrazo de Maipú =

Abrazo de Maipú
- Antarctic Refuge
- Location of Abrazo de Maipú in Antarctica
- Coordinates: 63°23′17″S 57°34′58″W
- Country: Chile; Argentina
- Location in Antarctica: Trinity Peninsula; Antarctic Peninsula; Antarctica
- Administered by: Chilean Army; Argentine Army
- Established: 1967
- Closed: 2010
- Type: Seasonal
- Status: Closed

Abrazo de Maipú is a refuge located on the Trinity Peninsula of the Antarctic Peninsula.

It was built for the first time on September 7, 1967, by Argentina and subsequently destroyed. The refuge, rebuilt in July 2003, is a container fitted with kitchen, bathroom and bedrooms, accommodating 8. Its aim was to guarantee and facilitate rescue, scientific and patrolling activities carried out jointly by the personnel of O'Higgins Base and Esperanza Base. It was managed jointly by the Chilean Army and the Argentine Army.

Its name, which means "the Maipú embrace", commemorates a meeting in which Argentine general José de San Martín and Chilean general Bernardo O'Higgins embraced in 1818 after winning the Battle of Maipú, a key event in the independence of Chile.

On September 28, 2005 three Chilean soldiers died falling into a crevasse. They were moved from the Abrazo de Maipú refuge to the O'Higgins Base. The Refuge was closed in 2010.

== See also ==
- List of Antarctic research stations
- List of Antarctic field camps
