= Alejandro Flores =

Chilean poet, dramatist and actor

Alejandro Flores Pinaud
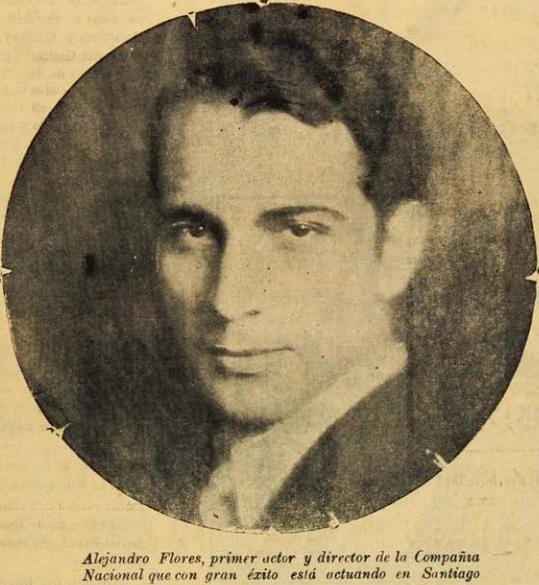
- Flores in 1927
- Born: February 9, 1896; Santiago, Chile
- Died: January 6, 1962 (aged 65); Chile
- Occupations: Poet, playwright, actor
- Writing career
- Notable awards: National Prize of Art of Chile

Alejandro Flores Pinaud (1896–1962) was a Chilean poet, dramatist and actor. In 1946, the Chilean government distinguished his career with the National Art Award.

== Early life ==
Flores became interested in theater at a young age. He was educated at Patrocinio de San José and San Pedro Nolasco schools. He did not do well in school and was expelled from the San Bernardo Non-Commissioned Officer School.

== Career ==
Flores was invited to join the Chilean Theater Company in 1915.

In 1917 he went on tour in Peru and Argentina with Enrique Baguena, Arturo Buhrle, Mario Padin and Bernardo Jambrina.

He began writing several lyrical pieces and in 1919 he staged one, "El derrumbe" ("The Collapse") in Santiago. He was not only the creator of the script, but he played the lead role. The play was successful earning him fame in Chile and Argentina. Two years later, his "Malhaya tu corazón" ("Curse your heart"), repeated the success of his debut feature.

In 1922, he worked for the Mario Padín Company in Argentina. That same year he married the Argentinian actress Carmen Moreno Jofré.

In 1930 he started in Norte y Sur, Chile's first sound film.

He was a devoted admirer of the heroes of the Chilean War of Independence and became a collector of objects linked to these heroes. One of the specific manifestations of this sentiment was the creation of the Museum of the Patria Vieja, in a central house of Rancagua, where he resided for some years. This museum opened its doors on October 24, 1950. The president at the time, Gabriel González Videla, and a good set of authorities and respectable neighbors of the city attended its inauguration. They sold the house and its collection two years later to the government of Chile. It became part of the Rancagua Regional Museum.

Flores was the author of two successful books of poetry.

== Influence ==
In his book, 'The dance of reality', Alejandro Jodorowsky evokes his namesake Alejandro Flores in whose troupe he worked for a short time. The latter taught him the power of the name: 'It was the first time that someone told me that if we exalted our name it became the most powerful amulet... Alejandro Flores is a sound amulet that fills theatres... Go and inseminate your own name, learn to love it, to exalt it, to discover what treasures it contains.'

== Selected works ==
- "El derrumbe" (play)
- "Malhaya tu corazón" (play)
- "A toda maquina"
- "El Ultimo brindle"
- Norte y Sur (North and South) (1930 film)
- Su esposa diurna (Your daytime wife) (1944 film)
- The House is Empty (1945 film)
