= Luisa Recabárren de Marin =

Chilean socialite and spy (1777–1839)

- Born: 1777; La Serena
- Died: after 1820
- Occupation: salon president
- Children: Francisco; Mercedes; Ventura; Estanislao; Javiera

Luisa Recabárren de Marin (1777 – after 1820), was one of the national heroines of the Chilean War of Independence. A socialite and the host of a literary salon, she was able to serve as a spy and advisor for the rebels using her influential contacts.

== Biography ==
=== Early and personal life ===
Born in La Serena around 1777, Luisa Recabárren de Marin was the daughter of Josefa Genara Aguirre Rojas Argandoña, and Francisco de Paula Recabarren Pardo Figueroa, relative of José de Recabarren y Pardo de Figueroa, the Condado de Villaseñor. Luisa's high-status parents gave her a high-quality education, where she learned French. In addition to this, she possessed a great curiosity for a variety of topics, including historical, social, religious, and political matters.

She had five children with José Gaspar Marín Esquivel. Her children were: Francisco, Mercedes, Ventura, Estanislao, and Javiera.

=== Salon ===
Influenced by the work of the pro-Chilean independence Camilo Henríquez, Luisa Recabárren de Marin used her salon as a platform to discuss revolutionary ideas. In her salon, she planned revolts using information from high-profile contacts and plotted a path towards independence. Her advice was well-respected and heeded, and her salon was regarded as the epicenter of discussion of the revolution.

Later, as Spanish forces advanced in Chile, all of her personal assets (her husband had temporarily relocated to Argentina and she managed his business) were seized by the Spanish. However, she was able to get them back and resume her salon due to her high status.

She was imprisoned in the Las de Agustinas Monastery from 4 January to 12 February 1817.

=== Death ===
Sources are not specific about her death, but one reports that she died in Santiago on 31 May 1839.
