= Chilean War of Independence =

1810–1826 war between Chile and Spain

- Part of the Spanish American wars of independence
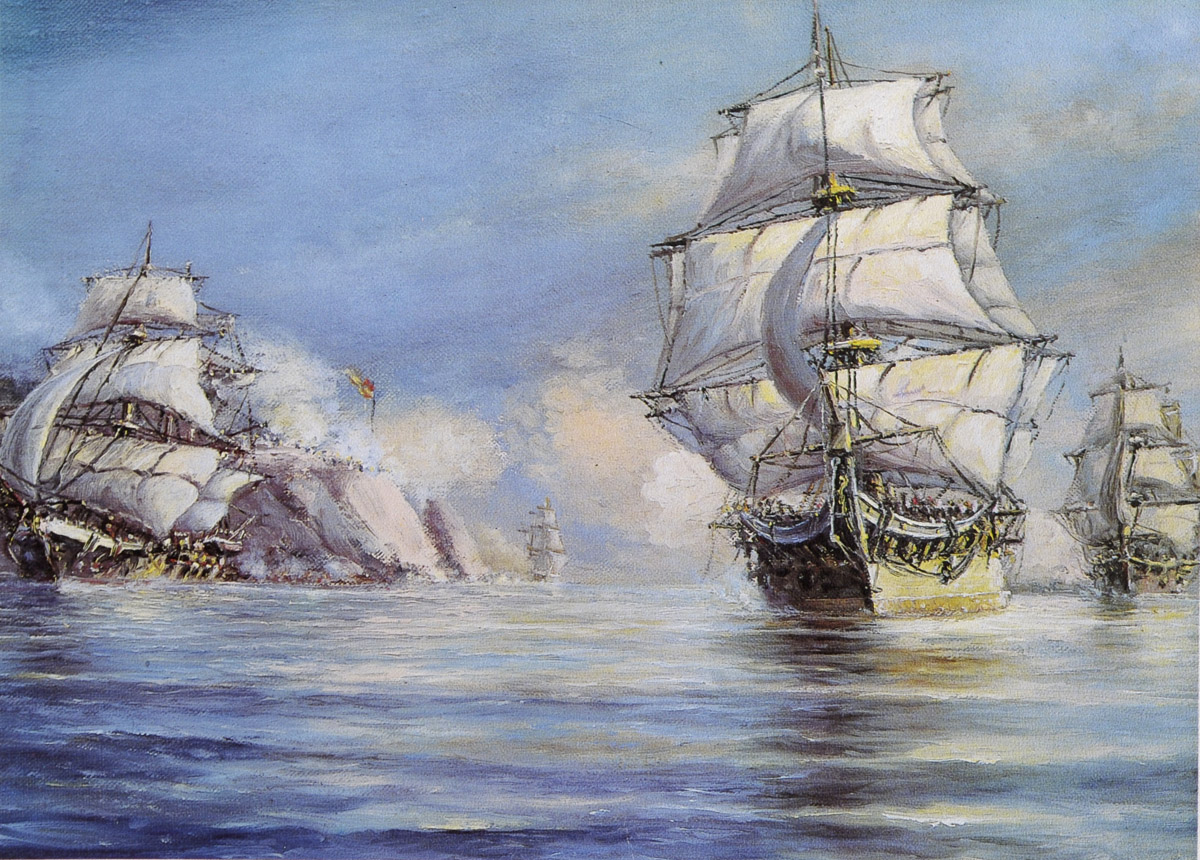
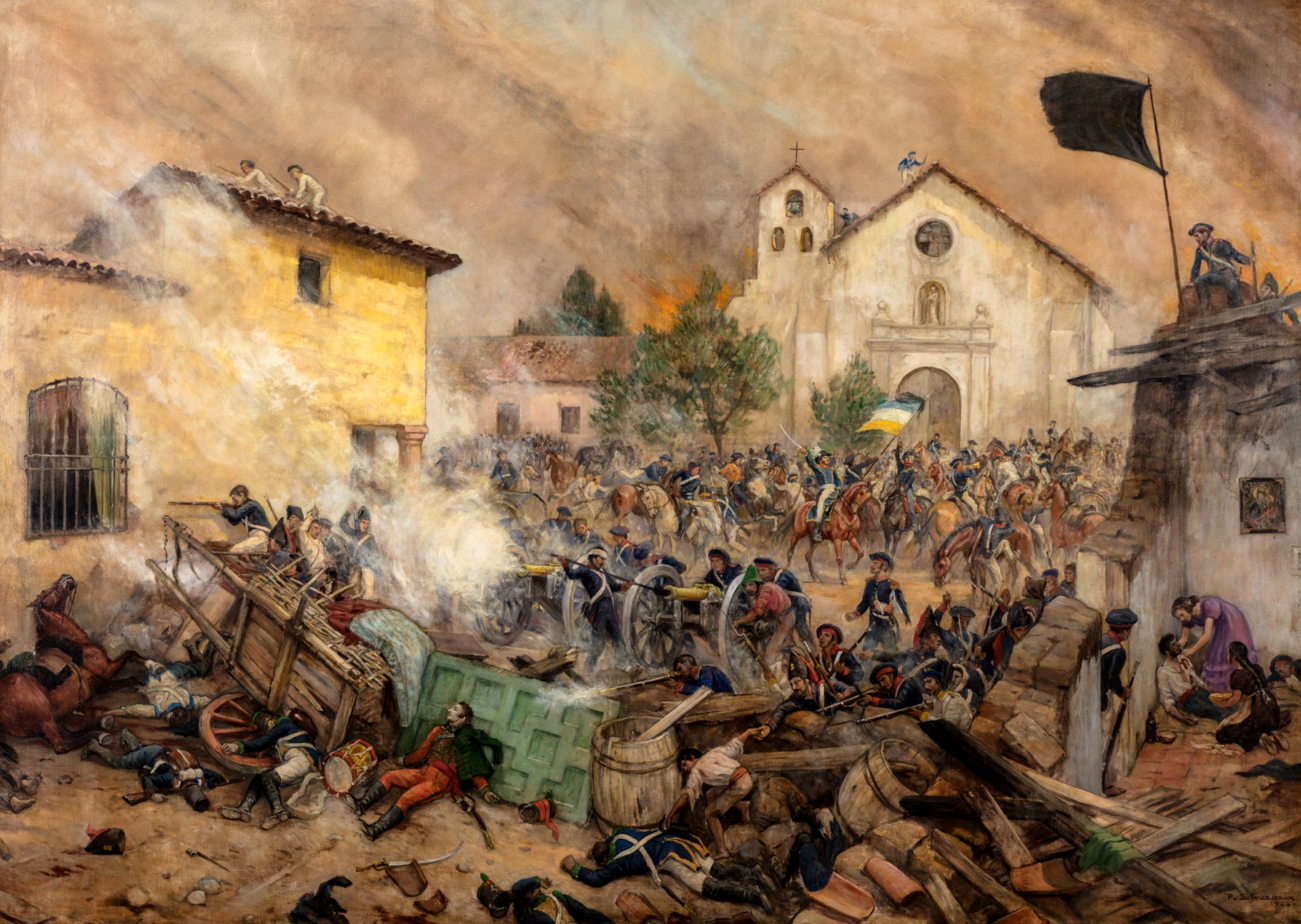
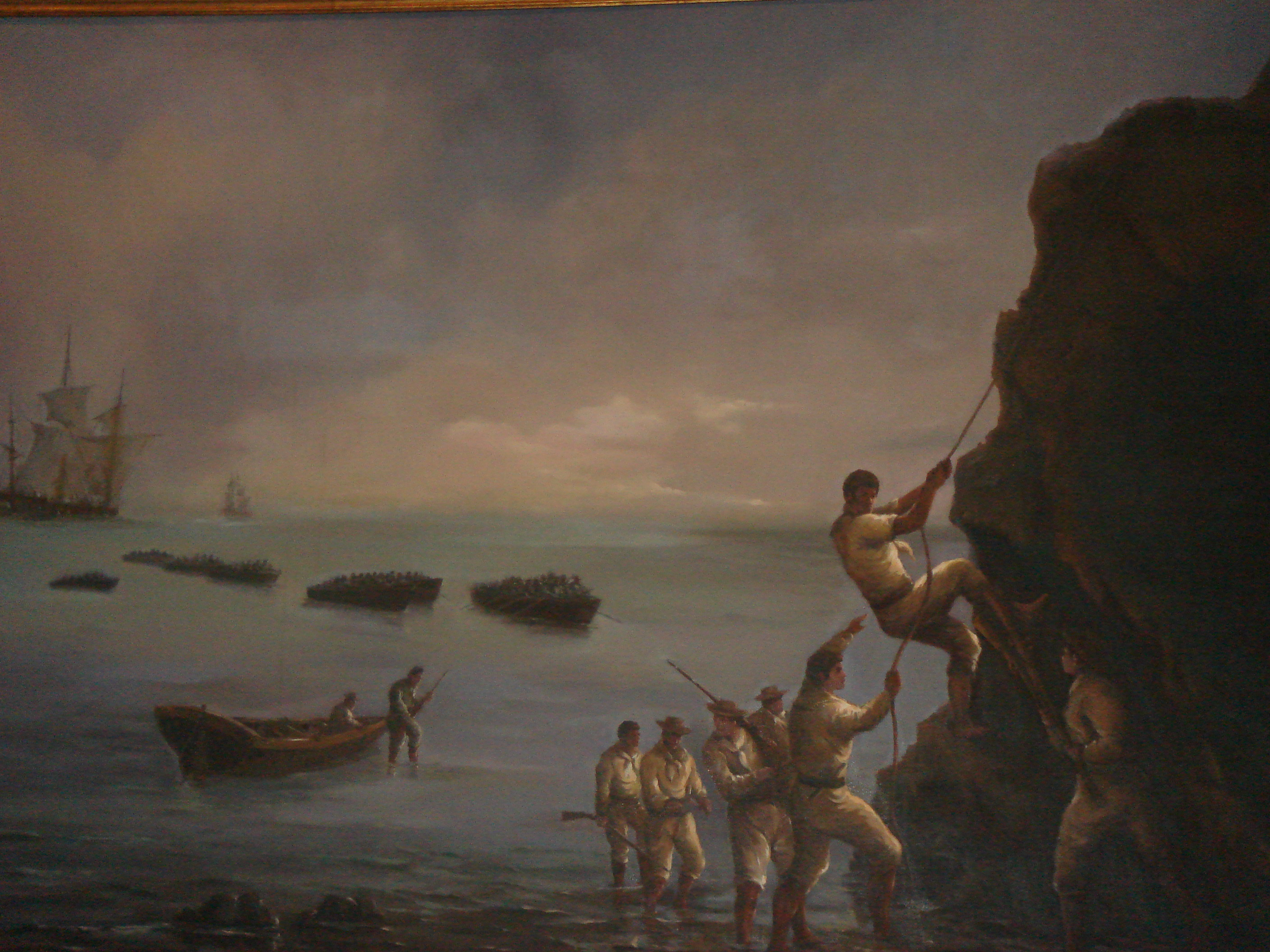
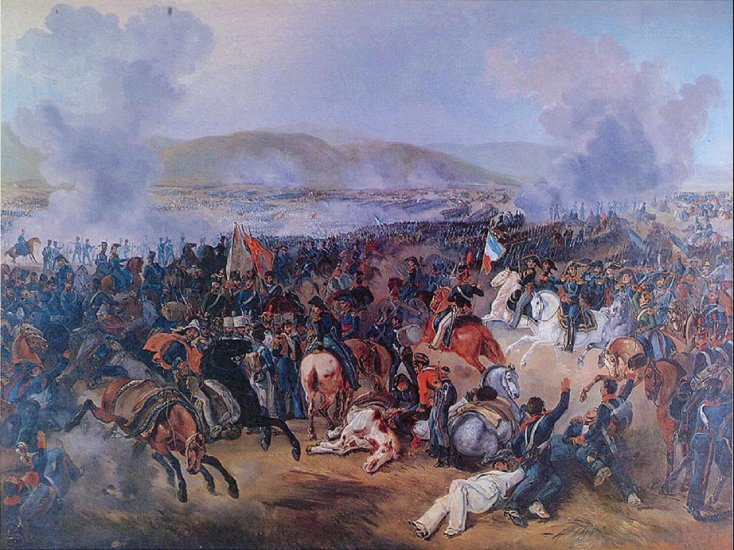
- (clockwise from top right): The Battle of Rancagua (1–2 October 1814); The Battle of Maipú (5 April 1818); The Capture of Valdivia (3–4 February 1820); The Battle of San Carlos Bay Pass (11 January 1826)
Date	1812 – 1827 (15 years)
Location	The Captaincy General of Chile and the governorates of Valdivia, Osorno and Chiloé, the Araucanía, South Pacific of America and Neuquén Basin
Result	Patriots victory
Territorial changes	De facto Chile's independence from the Spanish Crown (1818); Chilean annexation of Valdivia and Osorno (1820), and Chiloé (1826)

Belligerents
Patriots Government of Chile (until 1814); Government of Chile (since 1817); United Provinces of the Río de la Plata: Mapuche groups; Abajinos; Pehuenche facs.	Royalists: Kingdom of Spain and the Indies (since 1700); Spain; the Indies; Viceroyalty of Peru; Captaincy General of Chile; Governorate of Chiloé; Mapuche groups; Arribanos; Pehuenche facs.; Costinos; Huilliches; Boroanos

Commanders and leaders
J. M. Carrera; F. de la Lastra; B. O'Higgins; Manuel Rodríguez Erdoíza; Ramón Freire; M. Blanco Encalada; Thomas Cochrane; Joaquín Prieto; Juan de Dios Rivera; José M. Borgoño; J. M. de Pueyrredón; José de San Martín; Antonio G. Balcarce; Juan G. de las Heras	José F. de Abascal; Antonio Pareja †; Juan F. Sánchez; Gabino Gaínza; Mariano Osorio; F. M. del Pont (POW); J. de la Pezuela; Rafael Maroto; José Ordóñez (POW); T. Blanco Cabrera; Vicente Benavides (executed); Juan M. Pico (executed); A. de Quintanilla (surrendered)

Strength
Chilean Army; Chilean Navy and privateers Army of the Andes; Mapuche warriors	Royalist Army; Spanish Navy and privateers Mapuche warriors

Casualties and losses
Unknown	Unknown

The Chilean War of Independence (Spanish: Guerra de la Independencia de Chile, 'War of Independence of Chile') was a military and political event that allowed the emancipation of Chile from the Spanish Monarchy, ending the colonial period and initiating the formation of an independent republic.

It developed in the context of the Spanish American Wars of independence, a military and political process that began after the formation of self-government juntas in the Spanish-American colonies, in response to the capture of King Ferdinand VII of Spain by Napoleonic forces in 1808. The First Government Junta of Chile was formed for that purpose. But then, it began to gradually radicalize, which caused a military struggle between Patriots, who were looking for a definitive separation from the Spanish Crown; and Royalists, who sought to maintain unity with the Crown.

Traditionally, Chilean historiography covers this period between the establishment of the First Government Junta of Chile (September 18, 1810) and the resignation of Bernardo O'Higgins as Supreme Director of Chile (January 28, 1823). It is also subdivided into three stages: the Patria Vieja (1810–1814), Reconquista (1814–1817) and the Patria Nueva (1817–1823). The war itself began in 1812 and lasted until the end of the 1820s, when the last royalist forces were defeated in the Chiloé Archipelago in 1826 and in Araucanía in 1827.

A declaration of independence was officially issued by Chile on February 12, 1818 and formally recognized by Spain in 1844, when full diplomatic relations were established.

== Background ==
At the start of 1808, the Captaincy General of Chile—one of the smallest and poorest colonies in the Spanish Empire—was under the administration of Luis Muñoz de Guzmán, an able, respected and well-liked Royal Governor. In May 1808 the overthrow of Charles and the start of the Peninsular War plunged the empire into a state of agitation. In the meantime, Chile was facing its own internal political problems. Governor Guzmán had suddenly died in February of that year and the crown had not been able to appoint a new governor before the invasion. After a brief interim regency by Juan Rodríguez Ballesteros, and according to the succession law in place at the time, the position was laid claim to and assumed by the most senior military commander, who happened to be Brigadier Francisco García Carrasco.

García Carrasco took over the post of Governor of Chile in April and in August the news of the Napoleonic invasion of Spain and of the conformation of a Supreme Central Junta to govern the Empire in the absence of a legitimate king reached the country. In the meantime, Charlotte Joaquina, sister of Ferdinand and wife of the King of Portugal, who was living in Brazil, also made attempts to obtain the administration of the Spanish dominions in Latin America. Since her father and brother were being held prisoners in France, she regarded herself as the heiress of her captured family. Allegedly among her plan was to send armies to occupy Buenos Aires and northern Argentina and to style herself as Queen of La Plata.

Brigadier García Carrasco was a man of crude and authoritarian manners, who managed in a very short time to alienate the criollo elites under his command. Already in Chile, as in most of Latin America, there had been some independence agitation but minimal and concentrated in the very ineffectual Conspiracy of the Tres Antonios back in 1781. The majority of the people were fervent royalists but were divided into two groups: those who favored the status quo and the divine right of Ferdinand VII (known as absolutists) and those who wanted to proclaim Charlotte Joaquina as Queen (known as carlotists). A third group was composed of those who proposed the replacement of the Spanish authorities with a local junta of notable citizens, which would conform a provisional government to rule in the absence of the king and an independent Spain (known as juntistas).

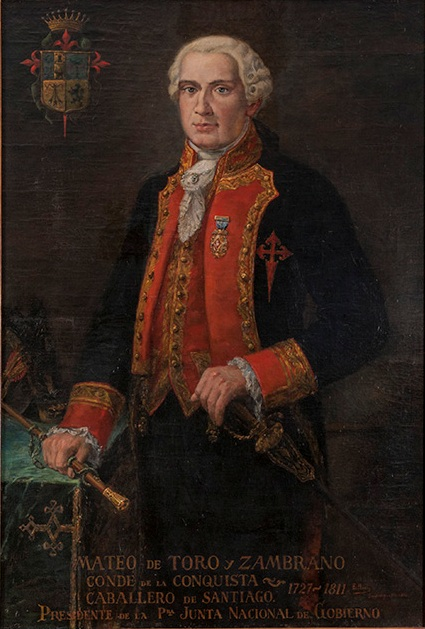
Mateo de Toro Zambrano

In 1809, Governor García Carrasco himself was implicated in a flagrant case of corruption (the Scorpion scandal) that managed to destroy whatever remnants of moral authority he or his office had left. From that moment on the pressure for his removal began to build. In June 1810 news arrived from Buenos Aires that Napoleon Bonaparte's forces had conquered Andalusia and laid siege to Cádiz, the last redoubt against the French on Spanish soil. Moreover, the Supreme Central Junta, which had governed the Empire for the past two years, had abolished itself in favor of a Regency Council. García Carrasco, who was a supporter of the carlotist group, managed to magnify the political problems by taking arbitrary and harsh measures, such as the arrest and deportation to Lima without due process of well-known and socially prominent citizens under simple suspicions of having been sympathetic to the junta idea. Among those arrested were José Antonio de Rojas, Juan Antonio Ovalle and Bernardo de Vera y Pintado.

Inspired by the May Revolution in Argentina, the autonomy movement had also propagated through the criollo elite. They resented the illegal arrests and, together with the news that Cádiz was all that was left of a free Spain, finally solidified in their opposition to the Governor. Brigadier García Carrasco was suspended from office and forced to resign on July 16, 1810, to be in turn replaced by the next most senior soldier, Mateo de Toro Zambrano Count of la Conquista, even though a legitimate Governor, Francisco Javier de Elío, had already been appointed by the Viceroy of Peru.

Count Toro Zambrano was, by all standards, a very unorthodox selection. He was a very old man already (82 years old at the time) and moreover a "criollo" (someone born in the colonies) as opposed to a "peninsular" (someone born in Spain). Immediately after his appointment in July, the juntistas began to lobby him in order to obtain the formation of a junta. In August the Royal Appeals Court (Spanish: Real Audiencia) took a public loyalty oath to the Regency Council in front of a massive audience, which put added pressure on the Governor to define himself. After vacillating for some time over which party to follow, Toro Zambrano finally agreed to hold an open Cabildo (city hall) meeting in Santiago to discuss the issue. The date was set for September 18, 1810 at 11 am.

== Patria Vieja ==
=== First Junta ===
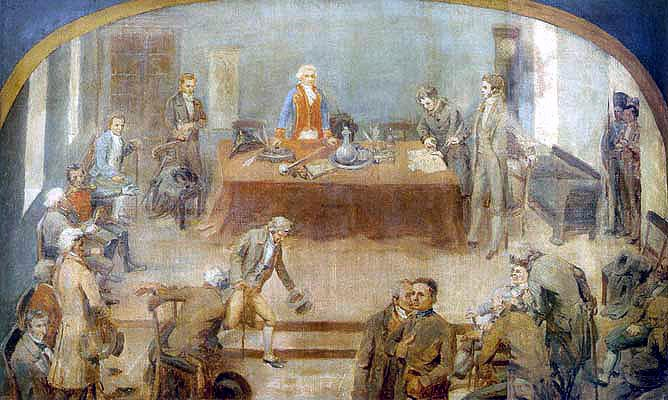
Opening session of the First Junta

From the very beginning, the juntistas took the political initiative. As soon as the Cabildo was called, they were able to place their members in the committee charged with sending the invitations, thus manipulating the attendance lists to their own advantage. At the September 18 session, they grabbed center stage with shouts of "¡Junta queremos! ¡junta queremos!" ("We want a junta! We want a junta!"). Count Toro Zambrano, faced with this very public show of force, acceded to their demands by depositing his ceremonial baton on top of the main table and saying "Here is the baton, take it and rule."

The Government Junta of the Kingdom of Chile, also known as the First Junta, was organized with the same powers as a Royal Governor. Their first measure was to take a loyalty oath to Ferdinand VII as legitimate King. Count Toro Zambrano was elected President, and the rest of the positions were distributed equally among all parties, but the real power was left in the hands of the secretary, Juan Martínez de Rozas. The Junta then proceeded to take some concrete measures that had been long-held aspirations of the colonials: it created a militia for the defense of the kingdom, decreed freedom of trade with all nations that were allied to Spain or neutrals, a unique tariff of 134% for all imports (with the exception of printing presses, books and guns which were liberated from all taxes) and in order to increase its representativity, ordered the convocatory of a National Congress. Immediately, political intrigue began amongst the ruling elite, with news of the political turbulence and wars of Europe all the while coming in. It was eventually decided that elections for the National Congress, to be composed of 42 representatives, would be held in 1811.

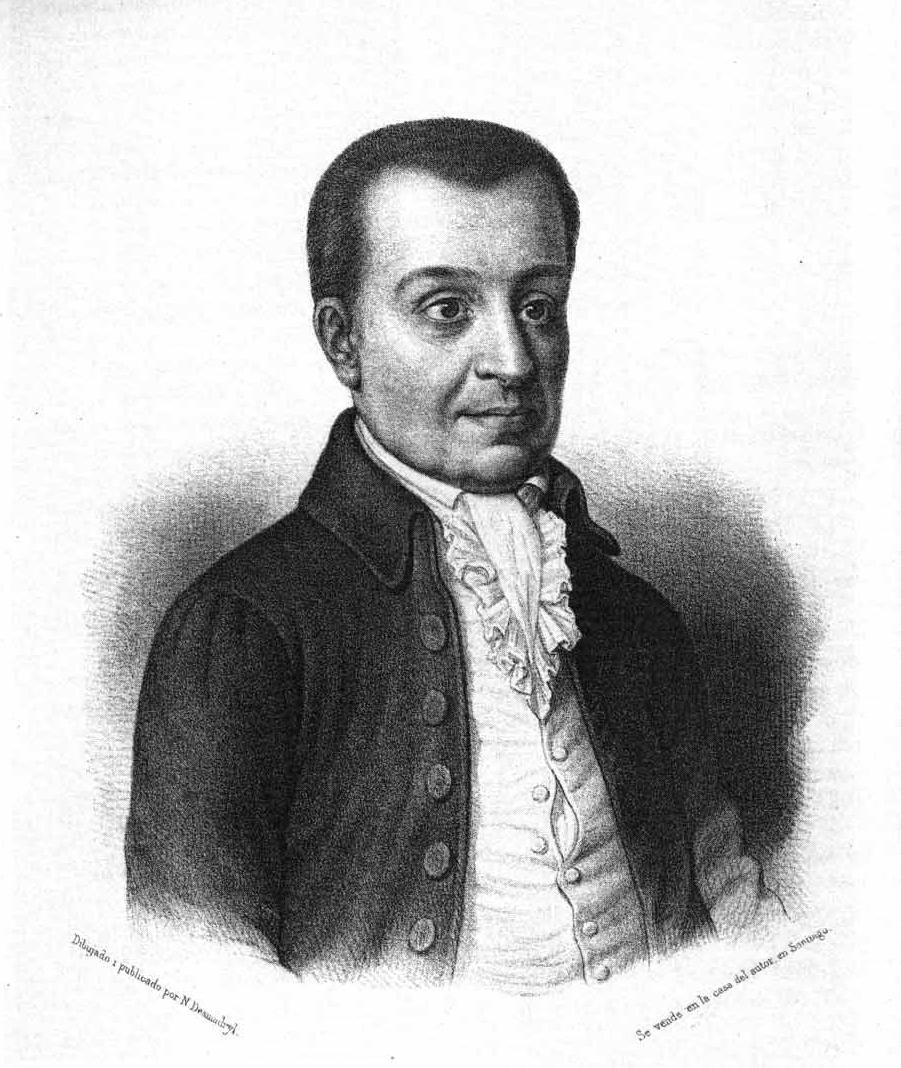
Juan Martínez de Rozas

Three political factions started to coalesce: the Extremists (Spanish: exaltados), the Moderates (Spanish: moderados) and the Royalists (Spanish: realistas). These groups were all decidedly against independence from Spain and differentiated themselves only in the degree of political autonomy that they sought. The Moderates, under the leadership of José Miguel Infante, were a majority, and wanted a very slow pace of reforms since they were afraid that once the King was back in power he would think that they were seeking independence and would roll-back all changes. The Extremists were the second most important group and they advocated a larger degree of freedom from the Crown and a faster pace of reforms stopping just short of full independence. Their leader was Juan Martínez de Rozas. The Royalists were against any reform at all and for the maintenance of the status quo.

By March 1811, 36 representatives had already been elected in all major cities with the exception of Santiago and Valparaíso. The great political surprise up to that point had been the results from the other center of power, Concepción, in which Royalists had defeated the supporters of Juan Martínez de Rozas. In the rest of Chile, the results were more or less equally divided: twelve pro-Rozas delegates, fourteen anti-Rozas and three Royalists. So, the Santiago elections were the key to Rozas' desire to remain in power. This election was supposed to take place on April 10, but before they could be called the Figueroa mutiny broke out.

On April 1, Royalist colonel Tomás de Figueroa—considering the notion of elections to be too populist—led a revolt in Santiago. The revolt sputtered, and Figueroa was arrested and summarily executed. The mutiny was successful in that temporarily sabotaged the elections, which had to be delayed. Eventually, however, a National Congress was duly elected, and all 6 deputies from Santiago came from the Moderate camp. Nonetheless, the mutiny also encouraged a radicalization of political postures. Although Moderates—who continued advocating political control of the elites and greater autonomy without a complete rupture from Spain—gained the majority of seats, a vocal minority was formed by Extremist revolutionaries who now wanted complete and instant independence from Spain. The Real Audiencia of Chile, a long-standing pillar of Spanish rule, was dissolved for its alleged "complicity" with the mutiny. The idea of full independence gained momentum for the first time.

=== Carrera dictatorship ===
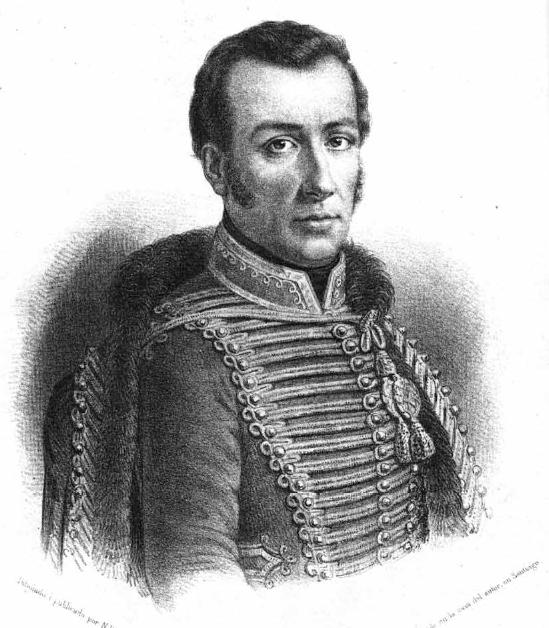
José Miguel Carrera

During this time, a well-connected young man and a veteran of the Peninsular War, José Miguel Carrera, returned to Chile from Spain. Quickly, he was involved with the intrigues of various Extremists who plotted to wrest power from Martínez de Rozas through armed means. After two coups, both in the end of 1811, the ambitious Carrera managed to take power, inaugurating a dictatorship. Prominent members of the government were Carrera's brothers Juan José and Luis, as well as Bernardo O'Higgins.

Meanwhile, a provisional Constitution of 1812 was promulgated with a marked liberal character. An example of this is the stipulation that "no order that emanates from outside the territory of Chile will have any effect, and anyone who tries to enforce such an order will be treated as a traitor." Carrera also created patriotic emblems for the Patria Vieja such as the flag, shield, and insignia. Also during his government, the first Chilean newspaper, the La Aurora de Chile was published under the editorship of Friar Camilo Henríquez. It supported the independence movement. Additionally, Carrera was responsible for bringing the first American consul to Chile. This was important, as it established a direct link between the liberalism and federalism of the United States with the principles of the Chilean independence movement. Finally, he founded the Instituto Nacional de Chile and the National Library of Chile. Both of these prestigious institutions have survived to the present day.

=== Spanish invasions ===
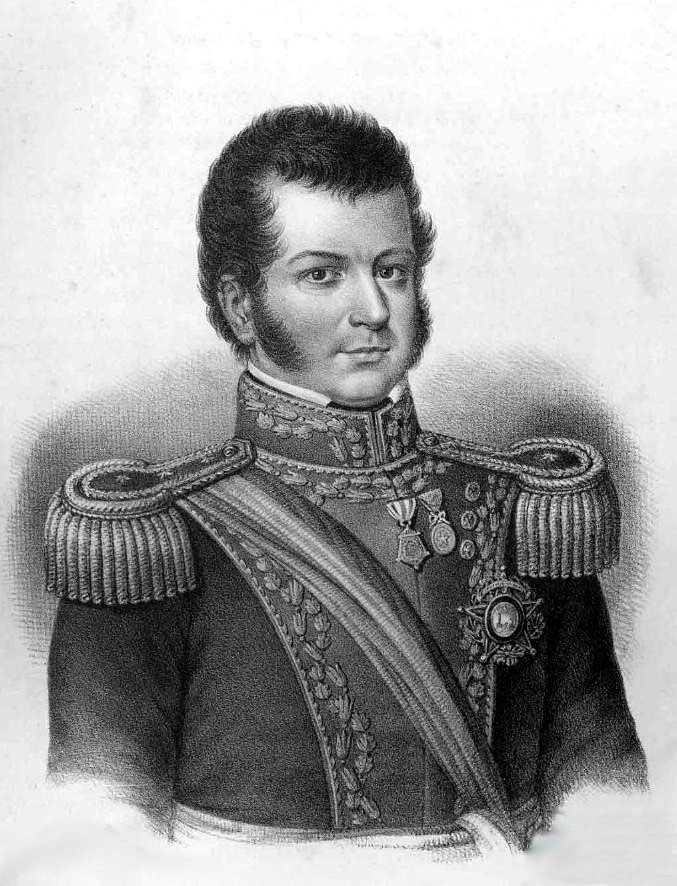
Bernardo O'Higgins

The triumph of rebellions—both in Chile and Argentina—disquieted the Viceroy of Peru, José Fernando de Abascal. As a result, in 1813, he sent a military expedition by sea under the command of Antonio Pareja to deal with the situation in Chile, and sent another force by land to attack northern Argentina. The troops landed in Concepción, where they were received with applause. Pareja then attempted to take Santiago. This effort failed, as did a subsequent inconclusive assault led by Gabino Gaínza. However, this was not due to the military performance of Carrera, whose incompetence led to the rise of the moderate O'Higgins, who eventually took supreme control of the pro-independence forces. Harassed on all sides, Carrera resigned, in what is commonly taken to mark the beginning of the period of the Reconquista.

After the attempt by Gaínza, the two sides had signed the Treaty of Lircay on May 14, nominally bringing peace but effectively only providing a breathing space. Abascal had no intention of honoring the treaty, and that very year sent a much more decisive force southwards, under the command of Mariano Osorio. The royalist force landed and moved to Chillán, demanding complete surrender. O'Higgins wanted to defend the city of Rancagua, while Carrera wanted to make the stand at the pass of Angostura, a more felicitous defensive position but also closer to Santiago. Because of the disagreements and resulting lack of coordination, the independence forces were divided, and O'Higgins was obliged to meet the royalists at Rancagua without reinforcements. The resulting battle, the Disaster of Rancagua, on October 1 and 2 of 1814, was fought fiercely, but ended in stunning defeat for the independence forces of which only 500 of the original 5,000 survived. A little while later, Osorio entered Santiago and put the rebellion of the Patria Vieja to an end.

== Reconquista ==
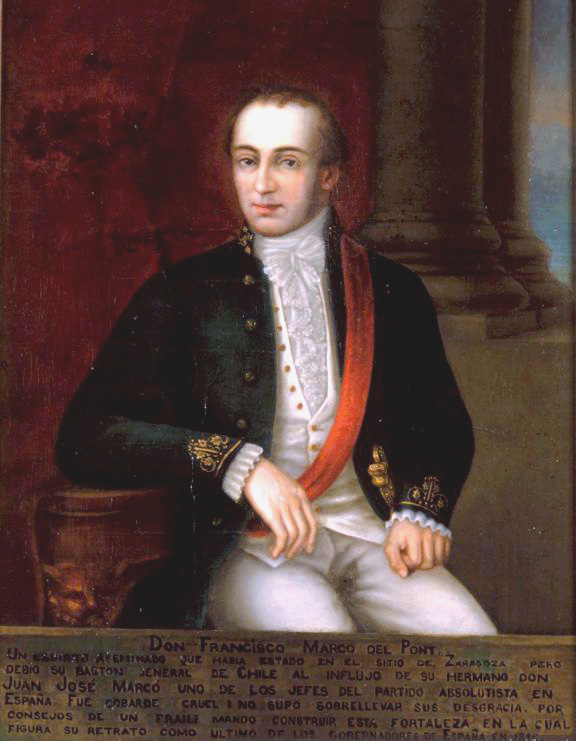
Francisco Casimiro Marcó del Pont

The viceroy Abascal confirmed Mariano Osorio as governor of Chile, although a later disagreement between the two would result in Osorio's removal and the installation of Francisco Casimiro Marcó del Pont as governor in 1815. In any case, the Spanish believed that it was necessary to teach the revolutionaries a good lesson and embarked on a campaign of fierce political persecution, led by the infamous Vicente San Bruno. The patriots found in Santiago—among whom were members of the First Junta—were exiled to the Juan Fernández Islands. Far from pacifying the patriots, these actions served to incite them, and soon even the most moderate concluded that anything short of independence was intolerable.

A large group of patriots (among them Carrera and O'Higgins) decided to flee to Mendoza, an Andean province of the newly independent Argentina. At the time, the governor of this province was José de San Martín, a leader of the Argentine independence movement who would become regarded as the "Simón Bolívar" of the southern part of Spanish South America. Upon the arrival of the exiles, San Martín immediately began to favor O'Higgins (probably because of their shared membership in the Logia Lautaro, a pro-independence secret society). Carrera's influence begun to fade and ended finally when he was executed by firing squad in 1821.

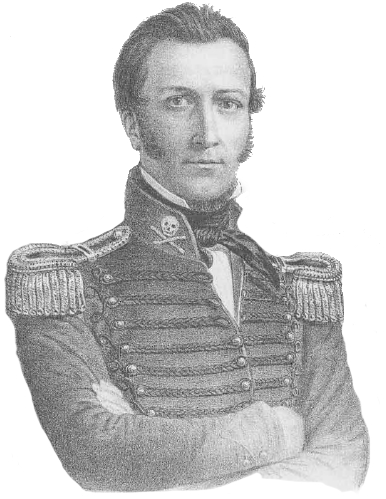
Manuel Rodríguez

While San Martín and O'Higgins organized an army to recross the Andes and recapture Santiago, they charged the lawyer Manuel Rodríguez with the task of mounting a guerrilla campaign. The goals of the campaign were to keep the Spanish forces off balance, ridicule San Bruno, and generally bolster the morale of the patriots. Through his subsequent daring exploits, Rodríguez became a romantic hero of the revolution. In one of his more celebrated actions, he disguised himself as a beggar and succeeded in obtaining alms from Governor Marcó del Pont himself, who by that time had put a price on Rodríguez's head.

The liberating Army of the Andes was prepared by 1817. After a difficult crossing the Andes, royalist forces led by Rafael Maroto were encountered on the plain of Chacabuco, to the north of Santiago. The resulting Battle of Chacabuco, on February 12, 1817, was a decisive victory for the independence forces. As a result, the patriots re-entered Santiago. San Martín was proclaimed Supreme Director, but he declined the offer and put O'Higgins in the post, where he would remain until 1823. On the first anniversary of the Battle of Chacabuco, O'Higgins formally declared independence.

== Patria Nueva ==
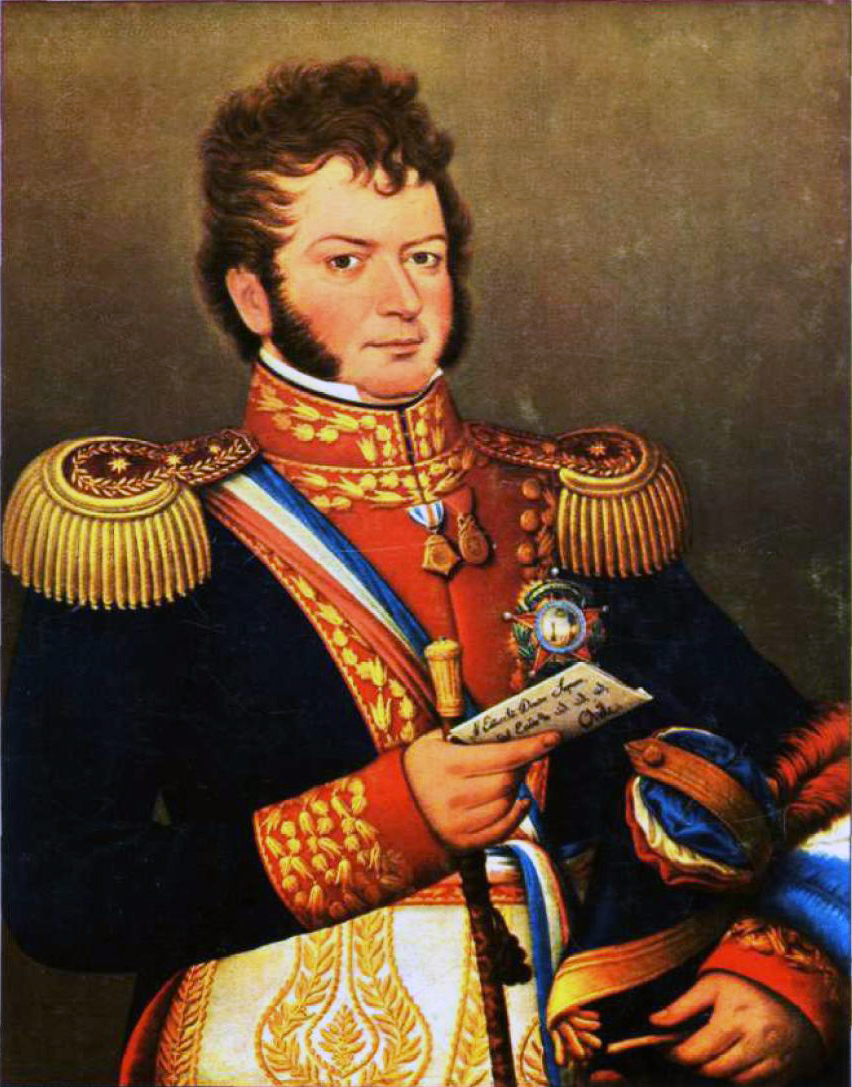
Bernardo O’Higgins, 'libertador' of Chile

During the preceding time, Joaquín de la Pezuela was installed as a new viceroy in Peru. He resolved to recall his son-in-law, Mariano Osorio, sending him south with another expeditionary force. The troops disembarked at Concepcion, and recruited a number of Amerindians to join their ranks. Meanwhile, Bernardo O'Higgins moved north to somehow stop the advance of the royalists. However, his forces were surprised and very badly beaten at the Second Battle of Cancha Rayada on March 18, 1818. In the confusion, a false rumor spread that San Martin and O'Higgins had died, and a panic seized the patriot troops, many of whom agitated for a full retreat back across the Andes to Mendoza. In these critical circumstances, the erstwhile Manuel Rodríguez jumped to the lead, haranguing and rallying the soldiers with the cry "There's still a country, citizens!" He named himself Supreme Director, a position which he would occupy for exactly 30 hours, which was the time the living, but wounded, O'Higgins took to return to Santiago and reclaim command.

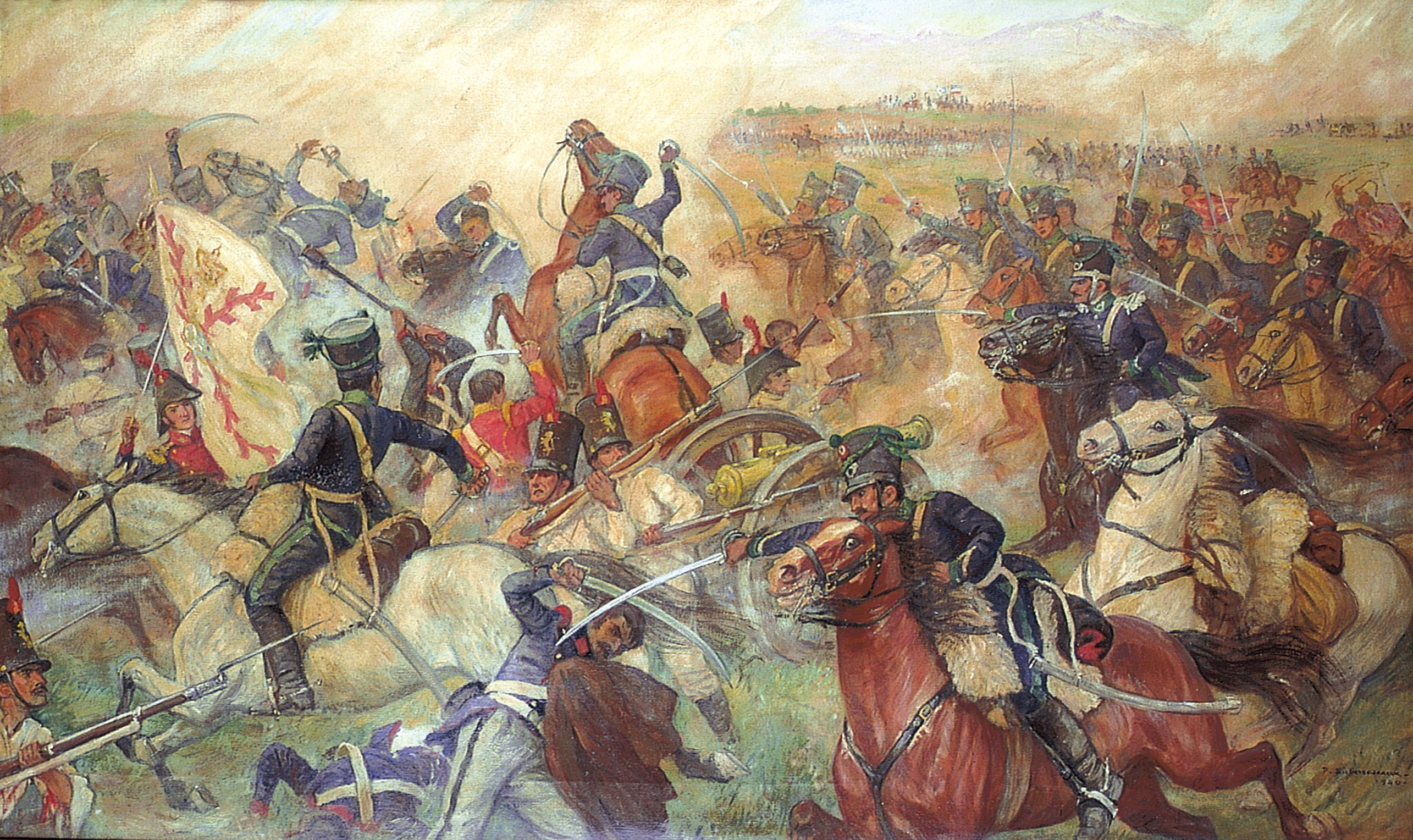
The Battle of Maipú

Then, on April 5, 1818, San Martín inflicted a decisive defeat on Osorio the Battle of Maipú, after which the depleted royalists retreated to Concepcion, never again to launch a major offensive against Santiago. Independence was all but secured, and worries about internal divisions were allayed when O'Higgins saluted San Martín as savior of the country, a moment which came to be known as the Embrace of Maipú.

=== Total war ===
To further secure Chilean independence, San Martín launched a series of actions against armed bands in the mountains, consisting of assorted outlaws, royalists, and Indians who had taken advantage of the chaos of military expeditions and forced recruitments to pillage and sack the countryside. This time of irregular warfare was later called the Guerra a muerte (Total war) for its merciless tactics, as neither the guerillas nor the government soldiers took prisoners. Only after the band of Vicente Benavides was liquidated in 1822 was the region around Concepcion finally pacified.

=== Incorporation of Valdivia and Chiloé ===
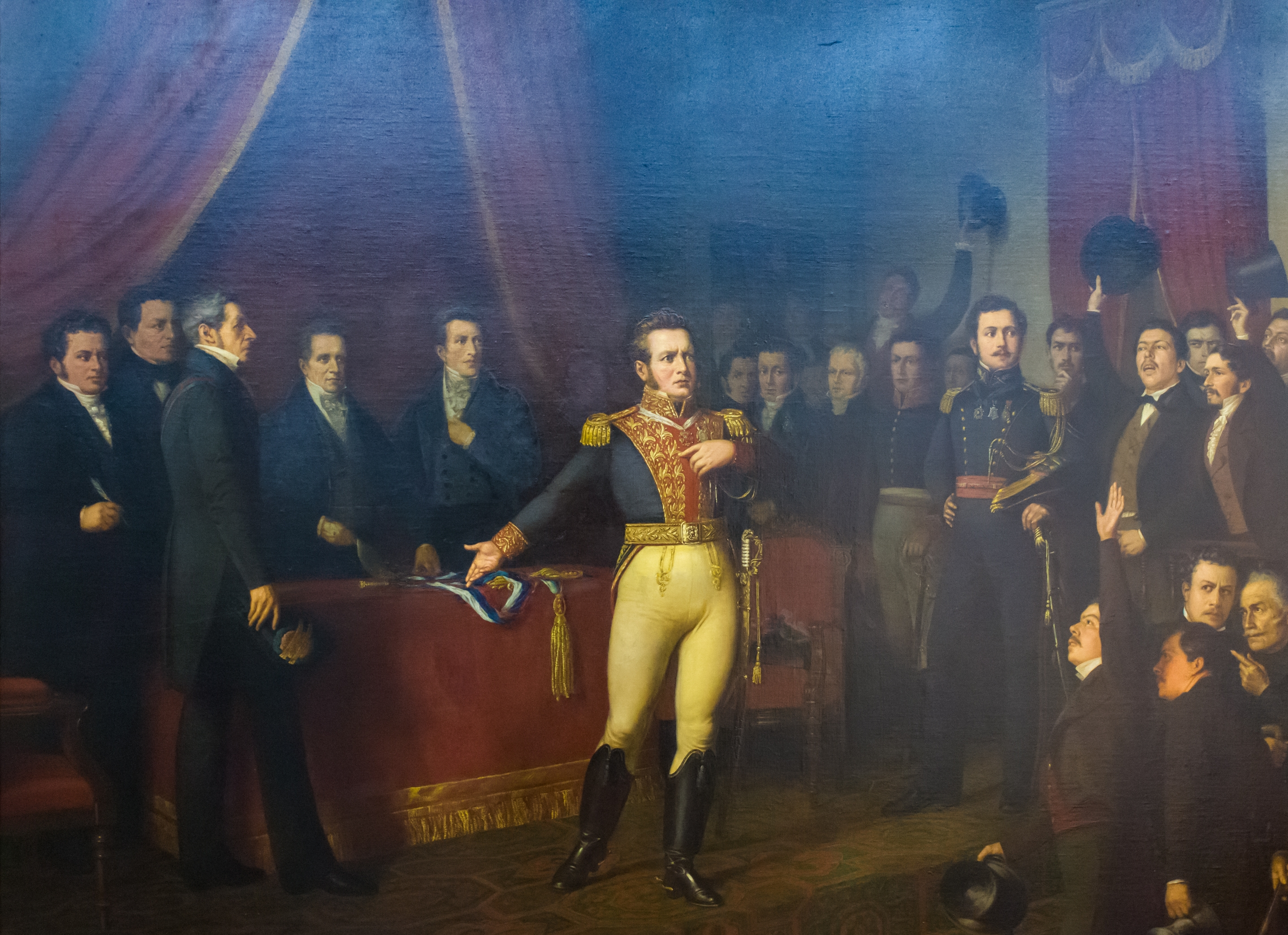
Resignation of O'Higgins

As San Martín worked to establish internal stability, O'Higgins also looked to defend the country against further external threats by the Spanish and continue to roll back imperial control. He developed the Chilean navy as a line of defense against seaborne attacks, placing the Scotsman Lord Cochrane in the post of admiral. In 1820, Cochrane administered a stunning blow to the remaining royalist forces in a successful attack on a complex of fortifications at Valdivia. Later Cochrane disembarked troops under commander William Miller at northern Chiloé Island in order to conquer the last Spanish stronghold in Chile, the Archipelago of Chiloé. This failed attempt ended in the minor but significant Battle of Agüi. Later on, Georges Beauchef headed from Valdivia an expedition to secure Osorno so that the Spanish would not reoccupy Valdivia from the land. Beauchef inflicted a decisive defeat on the royalists at the Battle of El Toro.

In any case, San Martín and O'Higgins were in agreement that the danger would not be passed until the Viceroyalty of Peru itself was independent from Spain. Thus, a fleet and army was prepared for an expedition to the country, and in 1820, San Martín and Cochrane set off for Peru. However, the audacious and daring character of Cochrane conflicted with the excessive prudence of San Martín. San Martín let escape a number of opportunities to land the decisive blow against the viceroy, and in the end it was Simón Bolívar who launched the final offensive after coming down from Colombia, Peruvian independence was secured after the Battle of Ayacucho on December 9, 1824, in which forces led by Antonio José de Sucre—a lieutenant of Bolívar—defeated the royalist army for good.

In Chilean historiography, the Patria Nueva generally ends in 1823, with the resignation of O'Higgins. However, the last Spanish territory in Chile, the archipelago of Chiloé, was not conquered until 1826, during the government of Ramón Freire, O'Higgins' successor.

== Economic impact ==
The independence wars in Chile (1810–1818) and Peru (1809–1824) had a negative impact on the Chilean wheat industry. Trade was disrupted and armies in Chile pillaged the countryside. The Guerra a muerte phase was particularly destructive and ended only to see a period of outlaw banditry (e.g. Pincheira brothers) occur until the late 1820s. Trade with Peru did not fully recover after the independence struggles. Being isolated from Central Chile by hostile Mapuche-controlled territory and dependent upon seaborne trade with the port of Callao in Peru the city of Valdivia was particularly badly hit by the decline of the trade with Peru. The fortune of this city would not shift until the arrival of German settlers in the late 1840s.

Much of the war effort was financed with silver from Agua Amarga, a mining area south of Vallenar discovered in 1811. Chile adopted a free trade policy already in 1811 with the "Decreto de Libre Comercio". This allowed the country in the mid-19th century to exploit the opportunities that the California Gold Rush and the Australian gold rushes created for exporting wheat.

In 1822 Bernardo O'Higgins government obtained a large loan in London to finance the independence struggle. The resulting Chilean independence debt took decades to regularize, ending the default in 1840s thanks to the efforts of the Ministers of Finance Manuel Rengifo and Joaquín Tocornal plus the favourable international markers for Chilean silver, copper and wheat.

== See also ==
- Argentine War of Independence
- Antonio de Quintanilla
- Antonio Pareja
- Antonio José de Sucre
- Bernardo O'Higgins
- Camilo Henríquez
- Charlotte Joaquina
- Francisco García Carrasco
- Francisco Marcó del Pont
- Ferdinand VII
- Founding of Talca
- Gabino Gaínza
- Juan Albano Pereira Márquez
- Georges Beauchef
- Logia Lautaro
- Lord Thomas Cochrane
- Manuel Rodríguez
- Mariano Osorio
- Mateo de Toro Zambrano
- Joaquín de la Pezuela
- Luisa Recabárren de Marin
- José de San Martín
- José Fernando de Abascal
- José Miguel Carrera
- José Miguel Infante
- Juan Martínez de Rozas
- Ramón Freire
- Rafael Maroto
- Simón Bolívar
- Vicente Benavides
- Vicente San Bruno
- William Miller
