= The House Is Empty =

1945 Chilean drama film by Carlos Schlieper

The House is Empty
- Directed by: Carlos Schlieper
- Written by: Jorge Janise
- Starring: Chela Bon; Alejandro Flores; Horacio Peterson
- Cinematography: Ricardo Younis
- Music by: Helmut Helfritz
- Production company: Chile Films
- Release date: 1945
- Running time: 84 minutes
- Country: Chile
- Language: Spanish

The House is Empty (Spanish: La casa está vacía) is a 1945 Chilean drama film directed by Carlos Schlieper and starring Chela Bon, Alejandro Flores and Horacio Peterson.

== Cast ==
- Chela Bon
- Alejandro Flores
- Horacio Peterson
- Maria Teresa Squella
- Ernesto Vilches

== Bibliography ==
- Rist, Peter H. Historical Dictionary of South American Cinema. Rowman & Littlefield, 2014.
