= Chela Bon =

Chilean actress

- Born: 1930; Santiago, Chile
- Died: 23 January 2010 (aged 79–80); Los Angeles, United States
- Other name: Graciela Bon Hewitt
- Occupation: Actress
- Years active: 1945 - 1989 (film)

Chela Bon (1930–2010) was a Chilean film actress.

== Selected filmography ==
- The House is Empty (1945)
- The Maharaja's Diamond (1946)
- Father Cigarette (1946)
- Si mis campos hablaran (1947)

== Bibliography ==
- Grant, Barry Keith. Schirmer Encyclopedia of Film: Academy Awards - Crime Films. Schirmer Reference, 2007.
