= Si mis campos hablaran =

1947 film

- Chilean theatrical release poster
- Directed by: José Bohr
- Written by: Kurt Fuchslocher
- Starring: Chela Bon
- Cinematography: Ricardo Younis
- Release date: 1 July 1947
- Running time: 77 minutes
- Country: Chile
- Language: Spanish

Si mis campos hablaran is a 1947 Chilean film directed by José Bohr and starring Chela Bon. It was entered into the 1954 Cannes Film Festival.

== Plot ==
The story takes place in 1847, when a ship carrying German immigrants arrives at Caleta Melipullí Bay (now Puerto Montt). Immigration agent Vicente Pérez Rosales (played by Roberto Parada) greets them and provides tools and animals for the settlers to begin exploiting the land granted to them.

As time passes, the settlers realize the monumental task of clearing the area, which is covered in ancient alerce trees. However, despite the difficulties, they persevere and cultivate the land. Characters Daniel (played by Rodolfo Onetto), Simón (played by Armando Bó), and Dora symbolize the challenging struggle to conquer the untouched lands of southern Chile, despite the numerous obstacles and frustrations that arise.

The movie was filmed entirely on the shores of Lake Llanquihue, with the Osorno volcano visible in the background for most outdoor scenes.

== Cast ==
- Chela Bon as Andréa
- Armando Bó as Simon
- Carlo Bon as Guillermo
- Humberto Onetto as Daniel
- Arturo González as Don Pancho
- José Bohr
- Ester Soré
