= Battle of Maipú =

1818 battle of the Chilean War of Independence

Coordinates: 33°30′4″S 70°46′19″W

- Part of the Chilean War of Independence
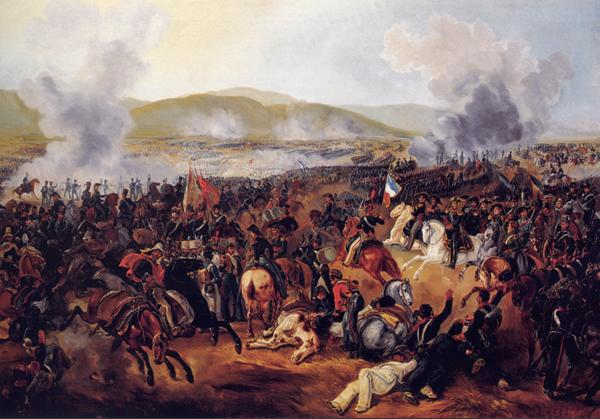
- Battle of Maipú, painted in 1837
Date	5 April 1818
Location	Maipú plains, near Santiago, Chile
Result	Patriot victory

Belligerents
Chile (Argentina) United Provinces	Kingdom of Spain and the Indies

Commanders and leaders
(Chile) Bernardo O'Higgins (Argentina) José de San Martín	(Spain) Mariano Osorio (surrendered)

Units involved
United Army	Royalist army

Strength
5,000; 21 guns	5,000; 12 guns

Casualties and losses
1,000	2,000 killed 3,000 captured

The Battle of Maipú (Spanish: Batalla de Maipú) was fought near Santiago, Chile on 5 April 1818, between South American rebels and Spanish royalists, during the Chilean War of Independence. The Patriot rebels led by Argentine general José de San Martín effectively destroyed the Spanish forces commanded by General Mariano Osorio, and completed the independence of the core area of Chile from Spanish domination.

== Background ==
In 1817, the Argentine General José de San Martín led an army across the Andes and defeated the Spanish in the battle of Chacabuco and captured Santiago. The Spanish viceroyalty sent a Spanish army to Santiago under General Mariano Osorio, which defeated San Martín at the Second Battle of Cancha Rayada. The drive for independence never diminished, however, and the following year San Martín launched a final offensive, which was to decide the outcome of the war.

Despite being defeated at Cancha Rayada, the Patriot army regrouped again in less than two days, adding up to about 4,000 men, allowing San Martín to rebuild his units almost entirely. Hence, on April 2, after leaving the Ochagavía camp to travel to the lower hills of Maipo, the Patriot army emerged organized in three infantry divisions with a total of 396 chiefs and approximately 5,000 lower-ranked officers and soldiers.

The Royalist army meanwhile continued in its attempt to consolidate and defeat the Patriots, and after Cancha Rayada begun a persistent and extenuating persecution, which was resisted in every town and countryside, delaying its advance towards Santiago and giving the Patriots some time to reorganize and to plan the way to stop Osorio and to avoid his entrance into the capital city.

Foreseeing this situation, General Bernardo O'Higgins employed some important measures which would serve the ultimate goal of defeating the Spanish, such as collecting the rifles and sabres given by Manuel Rodríguez to people after Cancha Rayada; speeding up the incoming supplies from Los Andes; acquiring or confiscating weapons held by individuals and merchants of Santiago to rearm the troops; gathering up combatants from the population coming up from the south and organizing a training camp at Ochagavía.

Meanwhile, Gen. Osorio, after passing through San Fernando by the end of March, realized that he had not defeated the Patriot army conclusively at Cancha Rayada, and moreover, that the latter was fit to fight and to win. Facing this fact, another encounter between the Patriots and Royalist army near Santiago became inevitable.

=== Battle preparations ===
Both armies established their headquarters near each other in the south of Santiago, where San Martín and Osorio prepared for battle.

At nightfall on 4 April the Royalist army settled at Lo Espejo, about seven kilometres from the Patriot forces. At dawn the next day, San Martín occupied the lower hills over the southern edge which runs from west to east, with Las Heras’ division to the right, Alvarado's division on the left and Quintana's division right behind them. The grenadiers were set on the extreme right and the Cazadores of the Dictatorial Army were arranged on the left flank. The artillery was divided into two brigades under Blanco Encalada and Borgoño, and protected by the infantry on the wings.

Osorio arranged his army on a triangular ridge at north of Lo Espejo. Primo de Rivera's division was formed on the left wing, while the Dragones de la Frontera Regiment was deployed over the road to Valparaíso. Morla's Division was set on the western half of the triangular plateau, and the right flank was formed by the Ordóñez Division.

== The battle ==
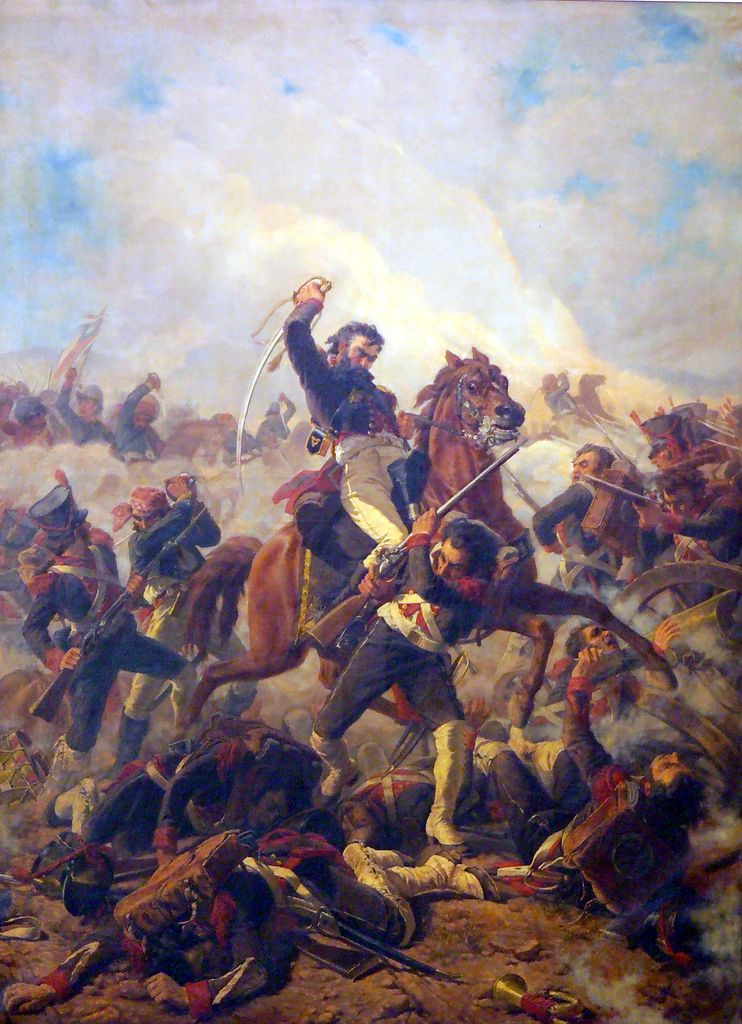
Charge of Colonel Santiago Bueras during the battle.

The battle began when the Patriot artillery opened fire about 11:30 AM, being immediately contested by its Royalist counterpart, although inflicting no casualties upon each other. After a half-hour of useless shelling, San Martín ordered Las Heras and Alvarado to move forward. The infantry advanced in columns without retaliating fire, until Las Heras threw his troops against Primo de Rivera with the support of Blanco Encalada's artillery, while Alvarado did the same against Ordóñez being covered by Borgoño's batteries. The grenadiers under Zapiola were assailed by part of the Royalist cavalry, but managed to counterattack and chase the attackers to a little slope where they were decimated by a dense infantry and artillery fire. Obliged to retreat, Zapiola was reinforced and attacked again, successfully dispersing the enemy's cavalry and securing the Patriot right flank. During the fray, suddenly the Patriot reserve emerged from behind Las Heras and Alvarado's lines and engaged Morla and Ordóñez divisions. Right after, the Cazadores squadrons led by Col. Ramón Freire dispersed the Spanish cavalry on the eastern flank. On this charge died Chilean Colonel Santiago Bueras.

On the centre, both infantries attacked each other with intensity. Ordóñez division, reinforced with another two units – the Burgos and Arequipa battalions - charged the Patriot line, forcing it to cede a little. However, San Martín sent three battalions to the sector – The 1st and 3rd infantry battalions plus the 7th Battalion of Los Andes -, and these assaulted and split the Burgos Battalion, while the Arequipa Battalion was completely disbanded. The rest of the Royalist units formed in squares endured up to ten cavalry melees, but retreated after the centre and right wing withdrew to Lo Espejo. At this point Osorio deserted the field, leaving the Royalists under the command of Ordóñez.

The latter gathered six companies of Primo de Rivera's division and the rest of the Royalist infantry and made a final stand on the farm, decimating the Coquimbo Battalion which recklessly made a frontal charge. Then, San Martín ordered Blanco Encalada and Borgoño to hammer the position with their cannons. Pushed by the Patriot infantry, Ordóñez' men garrisoned on the houses of Lo Espejo were forced to surrender, while the militias brought by O'Higgins captured the dispersed soldiers.

== Outcome ==
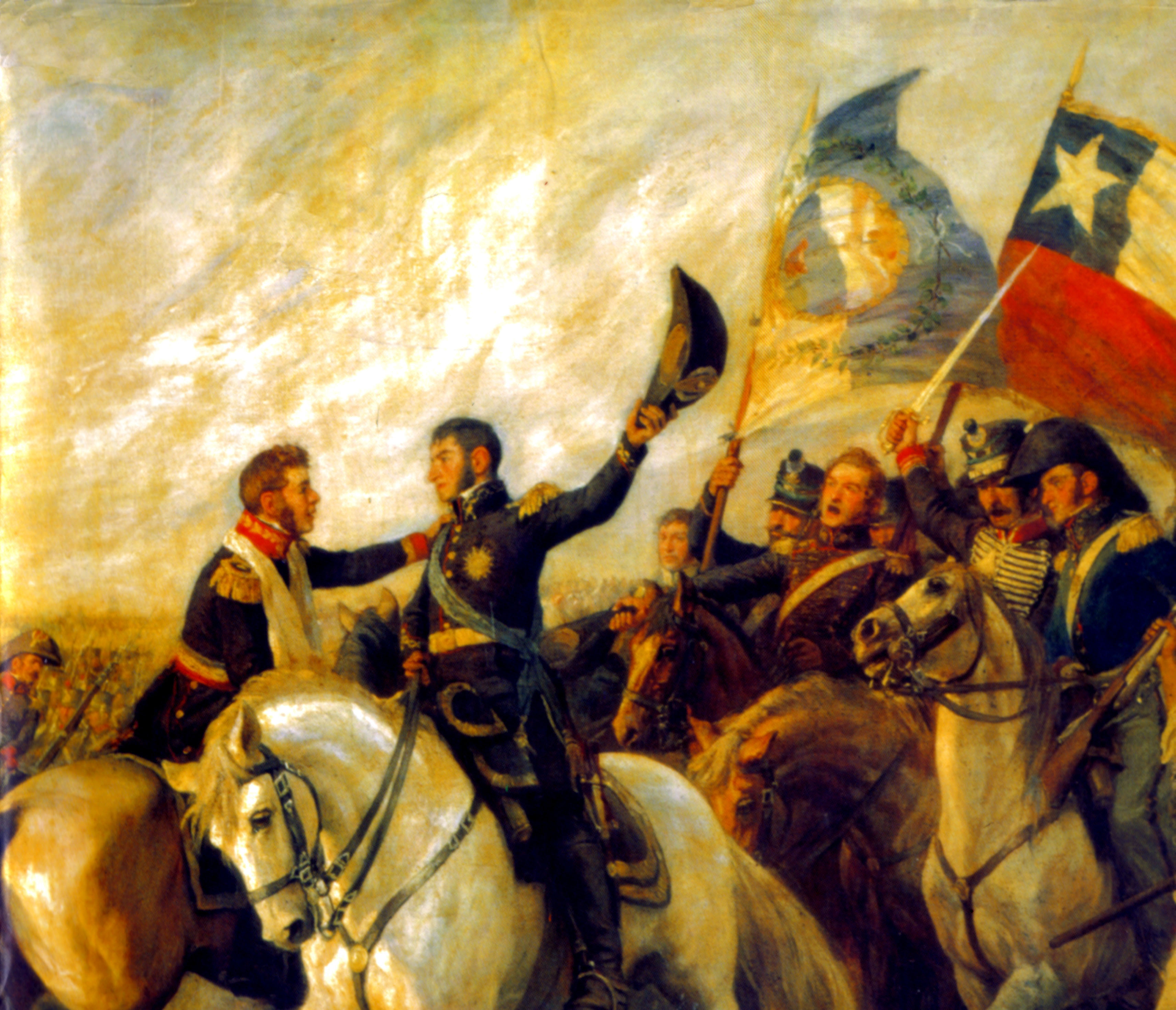
"The Embrace of Maipú" (between San Martin and O'Higgins) by Pedro Subercaseaux.

The battle left about 1,500 Spaniards dead and 2,289 captured; the patriots suffered 800 killed and 1,000 wounded. The victory had large consequences; it brought to an end major Spanish operations in Chile, and allowed the combined Chilean and Argentine force to launch a series of attacks against Spanish positions along South America's Pacific coast, culminating in the liberation of large parts of Peru from Spanish rule.

== Commemoration ==
The historic victory is marked yearly every 5 April with a joint civil-military parade in Maipú, where the battle occurred (this day is Armor Day for the Chilean Army). A living history event at the last Sunday of April ends a month of national festivities in honor of the victory. O'Higgins and San Martín embraced after the battle, an event commemorated as the "Abrazo de Maipú" (Hug of Maipú) in Argentina and Chile. An Antarctic refuge is named after the embrace.

== Order of battle ==
=== Patriots ===
United Army

Commander: General José de San Martín
Officers:

- Brigadier Antonio González Balcarce
- Coronel Hilarión de la Quintana

- Las Heras' Division (Colonel Las Heras)
  - 11th Infantry Battalion (Juan Gregorio de Las Heras)
  - Cazadores de Coquimbo (Isaac Thompson)
  - Battalion Infantes de la Patria (José Antonio Bustamante)
  - Mounted Grenadiers, 4 Squadrons (José Matías Zapiola)
  - 8 Field Pieces

- Alvarado' Division (Colonel Alvarado)
  - 2nd Infantry Battalion (José Bernardo Cáceres)
  - 8th Infantry Battalion (Enrique Martínez)
  - Cazadores de los Andes Battalion
  - Mounted Chasseurs de los Andes, 4 Squadrons
  - 9 Field Pieces

- Reserve Division (Colonel de la Quintana)
  - 1st Infantry Battalion (F. de Dios Rivera)
  - 3rd Infantry Battalion (Agustín López)
  - 7th Infantry Battalion (Pedro Conde)
  - Escort Cavalry, 2 Squadrons (Ramón Freire)
  - 4 Field Pieces

- Total: 5,000 men with 21 guns

=== Royalist ===
Royal Army of Chile

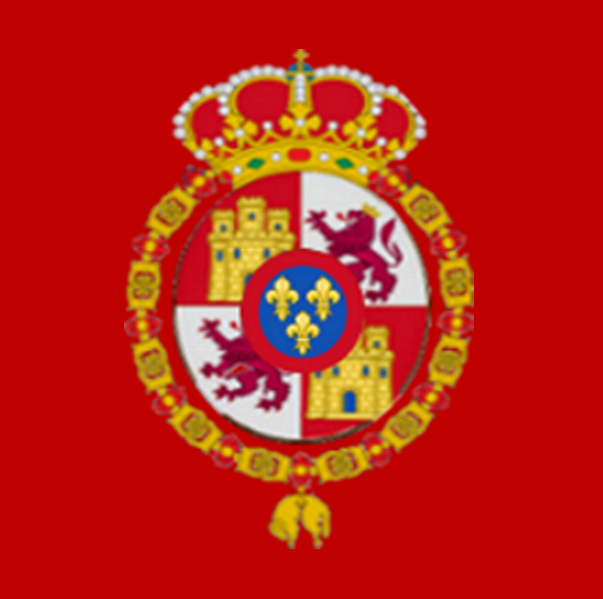
Royal Army of Chile
Commander: General Mariano Osorio

Officers:

- José Ordóñez
- Lorenzo López de Morla
- Joaquín Primo de Rivera
- Isidro Alaix Fábregas

- 1st Brigade (Colonel Ordóñez)
  - Battalion Concepción (Juan José Campillo)
  - Battalion Infante Don Carlos (Bernardo de la Torre)
  - 1 sapper company
  - Lanceros del Rey, 1 squadron (José Rodriguez)
  - Arequipa Dragoons, 1 squadron
  - 4 guns

- 2nd Brigade (Colonel Morla)
  - Battalion Arequipa (José Ramón Rodil)
  - Battalion Burgos (José Maria Baeza)
  - Chillan Horse Dragoons (Cipriano Palma)
  - Frontier Dragoons, 2 squadrons (Antonio Morgado)
  - 4 guns

- 3rd Brigade (Colonel Primo de Rivera)
  - Mixed battalion of elites (Grenadier and Chasseur companies from Battalions Burgos, Concepción, Infante and Arequipa)
  - 4 guns

Total: 5,000 men with 12 guns

== Notable People ==
José de San Martín, an Argentina general, lead the patriot forces in the battle. His efforts lead to the destruction of the royalist forces lead by general Mariano Osorio.

Also present on the patriot side was Bernard O'Higgins. O'Higgins was a Chilean statesman and general who commanded the Chilean contingent although Sam Martin was in overall command.

Antonio Pincheira fought in the battle for the loyalist cause. After the battle he founded a gang of called the "Pincheira Brothers". The gang would engage in many raids in Chile and Argentina ostensibly for the royalist cause. The gang would eventually incorporate Patriots and exiles from other political movements like Antonio.

== Sources ==
- Battle of Maipú: Its Causes, Events, and Effects Upon South America (Historical Text Archive)
- Compton's Home Library: Battles of the World CD-ROM
