= Ventura Miguel Marcó del Pont =

Spanish merchant and treasurer

Buenaventura Miguel Marcó del Pont Ángel Díaz y Méndez (15 November 1768 – 28 December 1836) was a Spanish merchant and treasurer for the Viceroyalty of the Río de la Plata.

Marcó del Pont was born in Vigo, Spain, the son of Buenaventura Marcó del Pont y Porí and of Juana Ángel Díaz y Méndez. He migrated to Buenos Aires in the 1790s and established a successful business. A member of the Spanish consulate (est. 1794), the Municipal Council or Cabildo (1797) and the Real Consulado de Comercio (1803), he was commissioner of the Real Caja de Consolidacion, in which capacity he had dealings with the Viceroy regarding the collection of taxes in Rio de La Plata. In 1807 he lent the Cabildo more than 12,000 pesos to offset losses incurred in the English invasions. He died on 28 December 1836 in Andalucia, Spain.

== Additional information ==
=== See also ===
- Francisco Marcó del Pont

=== Sources ===
- "Ventura Miguel Marco del Pont Correspondence, 1795-1820". Benson Latin American Collection (SRH) The University of Texas at Austin. Accessed November 2008. Online version
- "Alegacion juridica que en defensa de D. Miguel Bdntura Marco del Pont, don Pedro de Landaecheverry, y otros cargadores españoles de la fragata inglesa Hunter, ó Cazadora, escribió el Doct. don José Gerónimo Vivár y Lopez Lisperguer, abogado de los tribunales nacionales, catedrático de código. Alegacion juridica que en defensa de D. Miguel Bentura Marco del Pont". Latin American pamphlet digital project at Harvard University. Preservation microfilm collection; 3608. Accessed November 2008. Online version
