= Juan Gregorio de las Heras =

Early 19th-century Argentine soldier and politician

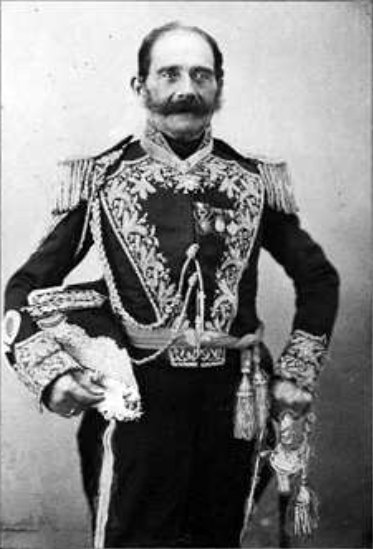

Governor of Buenos Aires Province
- In office April 2, 1824 – February 7, 1826
- Preceded by: Martín Rodríguez
- Succeeded by: Manuel Dorrego

Personal details
- Born: July 11, 1780 Buenos Aires, Argentina
- Died: February 15, 1866 (aged 85) Santiago, Chile

Military service
- Allegiance: United Provinces of South America; Chile
- Rank: Grand Marshal
- Unit: Army of the Andes
- Battles/wars: British invasions of the River Plate; Chilean War of Independence; Siege of Chillán; Battle of Cucha Cucha; Battle of Membrillar; Battle of Quechereguas; Battle of Chacabuco; Second Battle of Cancha Rayada; Battle of Maipú; Peruvian War of Independence; First siege of Callao

Grand Marshal Juan Gregorio de las Heras (July 11, 1780 – February 15, 1866) was an Argentine soldier who took part in the Spanish American wars of independence and was also governor of the province of Buenos Aires.

== Biography ==
Las Heras was born in Buenos Aires, from a moderately wealthy family. He engaged in business till the age of twenty-six, when he enlisted in the army, taking part in the resistance against the British invasions of the Río de la Plata (1806–1807). In 1808 he became sergeant of hussars. When the 1810 May Revolution took place, he acted with the patriots. He was appointed captain of militia in Córdoba, and in 1812 he became commander of the garrison of that city. In 1813 he offered to accompany the auxiliary Argentine division sent to Chile, of which he became second in command. After the Battle of Cucha Cucha he attained the rank of colonel, and after the defeat of Rancagua (2 October 1814) he retired in good order and twice repulsed the enemy, returning to Mendoza, where he employed himself in the organization of the Army of the Andes.

On November 8, he was appointed as the first commander of the newly created 11th Line Infantry Regiment. Created at the proposal of General San Martín to the Government, during the organization of the Army of the Andes and using the Chilean Auxiliaries as the foundation. This was the same infantry corps that had been sent to Chile in 1812, commanded by then Lieutenant Colonel Las Heras to assist the Government Junta to face the invasion of the Royalists in Southern Chile. The Auxiliaries received their baptism of fire in the Battle of Cucha Cucha on February 23, 1814, and fought successfully for a second time in the Battle of Membrillar on May 20. After the important Spanish victory in Rancagua in October, they were charged with covering the retreat of their Chilean comrades and their government to the city of Mendoza.

In 1815, the 11th Line had the first regimental band of the Army of the Andes, thanks to the economic support of Rafael Vargas, a rancher from Mendoza. When the Army moved to Chile in 1817, the regiment crossed the mountain range using the Uspallata pass, always commanded by Las Heras. After contributing to winning the Battle of Chacabuco, he headed the South Division, that was involved in a night battle on April 4 in Curapaligüe and on May 5 in the Battle of Cerro Gavilán, two resounding victories. It also took part in the failed assault on Talcahuano, December 6. On April 5, 1818, the 11th Line fought heroically in the Battle of Maipú, which sealed the freedom of Chile. The regiment was created once again in 1885 and sent to hold positions in the frontier of the territories occupied by wild Indians, such as Tapalqué, Olavarria and Tres Arroyos, in the Province of Buenos Aires. In 1910 the President of Argentina, José Figueroa Alcorta, issued a decree to rename it 11th Infantry Regiment "General Las Heras" in honor of its first commander. Currently, the 11th Mountain Infantry Regiment is headquartered in Tupungato, Province of Mendoza.

In 1817, Las Heras took charge of a part of the Army of the Andes, replacing Antonio González de Balcarce. Leading one column by the pass of Uspallata, he commanded in the battles of Potrerillos, Guardia, and Villa de los Andes. Together with the forces of General San Martin he took part in the Battle of Chacabuco, (12 February 1817), and immediately afterward was sent to the south, where he gained the victories of Curapalihue, Vegas de Talcahuano, and Oavihm, and was present at both of the sieges of Talcahuano under the orders of General Bernardo O'Higgins.

He also participated in the liberating expedition to Peru. Transported by sea, the Regiment disembarked in Peru in September 1820, where it was involved in the battles of Nazca, Acarí and Jauja and in the siege and occupation of Lima on July 9, 1821, as well as in the surrender of the fort of El Callao on September 21. In 1824 the 11th Line was disbanded. In 1820 he was chief of staff of the liberating army of Peru, and in the same year was promoted to brigadier by the Argentine government, and general of division by the Chilean government. In Peru he had the command of the siege of the castles of Callao and received the title of Grand Marshal.

After his retirement from the Army in Peru, he went back to the Argentine Republic, where Las Heras was appointed governor of Buenos Aires by the Chamber of Representatives, succeeding General Martín Rodríguez in May, 1824. During his government the congress of the United Provinces of the Río de la Plata met on 16 December 1824, and Las Heras signed an international treaty by which Britain acknowledged the Argentine independence.

On the restoration of the confederation and the election of Bernardino Rivadavia to the executive, Las Heras delivered the government to him on February 7, 1826, and in 1826 he returned to Chile. He was deprived of his rank on account of his participation in the Chilean Civil War of 1829, but the rank was restored by the Chilean Congress in 1842 and by the Argentine congress in 1855. From 1862 till the time of his death he was inspector-general of the Chilean Army. Las Heras died in Santiago in 1866, at the age of 85.

== Tributes and Memorials ==
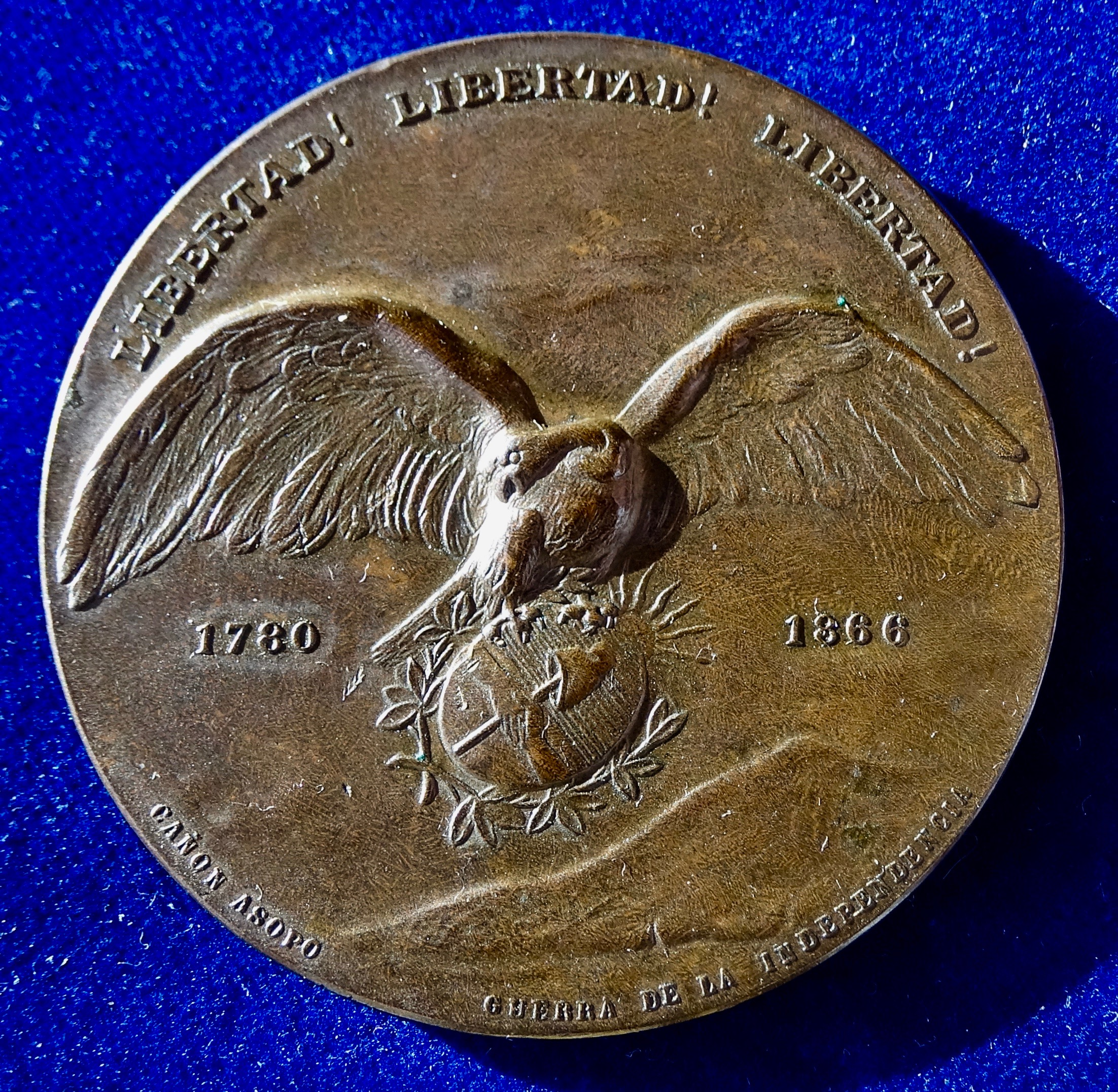
Argentine Art Nouveau Medal 1906 by Victor de Pol, Repatriation of his remains to Argentina, obverse

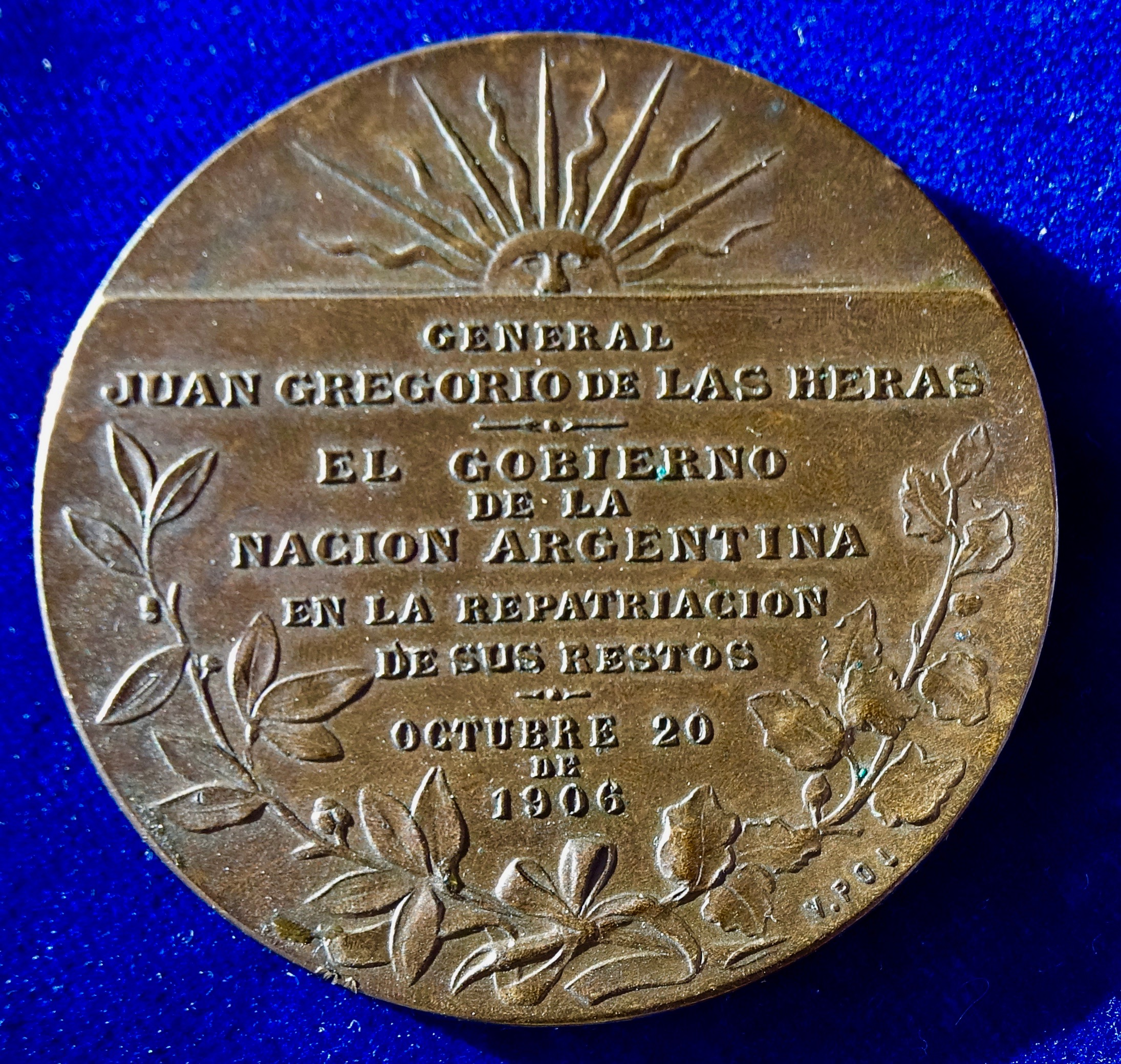
The reverse of this medal.

In 1906, the 40th anniversary of his death, his remains were repatriated to Argentina. For this event a medal was issued by the Argentine sculptor Victor de Pol.
