= Buenaventura Marcó del Pont =

Spanish businessman

Buenaventura Marcó del Pont y Bory (1738–1818) was a Spanish businessman, and founder of the family of the same name.

He was born in Calella, Barcelona in Catalonia. Early in his life, he relocated to Vigo, in Galicia, where he lived since at least 1750, and where he soon became one of its most important businessmen by building a new salting installation for the processing and distribution of fish to his native land. The good result of his business attracted some other Catalan families to the area, such as the Buch, the Curbera, the Escofet or the Fábregas.

As one of the most important ship-owners in Spain, he obtained from King Charles III of Spain in 1773, the first concessions to allow trading between the port of Vigo and the new world. In 1779 he obtained permission to attack the British naval commerce and that of its allies such as portugueses, during the American Revolutionary War. The good fortune of his ships made him a fortune in such articles as salt, oil, leather and cloth among others. In 1817, as a regidor of Vigo, he ordered the reconstruction of the Concatedral de Santa María de Vigo, which had been destroyed during the Peninsular War. He personally donated the statue of the Cristo de la Victoria, which is still the most important religious icon of the city.

Marcó del Pont married Juana Ángel Díaz y Méndez, with whom he had four sons. Two of them became very famous during their lifetime: Francisco Casimiro was the last Royal Governor of Chile and Buenaventura Miguel represented his father's company in Buenos Aires, and his family became one of the most important and wealthy of the Argentine republic.
