= Battle of Cancha Rayada (1818) =

Second Battle of Cancha Rayada
- Part of the Chilean War of Independence and the Argentine War of Independence
| Date | March 19, 1818 |
| Location | Near Talca, Chile |
| Result | Royalist victory |

Belligerents
| Chile (Argentina) United Provinces | Kingdom of Spain and the Indies |

Commanders and leaders
| (Chile) Bernardo O'Higgins (WIA) (Argentina) José de San Martín | (Spain) Mariano Osorio (Spain) José Ordóñez |

Units involved
| United Army | Royalist army |

Strength
| 7,000 | 5,000 |

Casualties and losses
| 150 killed 300 injured 2,000 dispersed | c. 200 killed and captured |

The Battle of Cancha Rayada (March 19, 1818), (also known in Chile as the Second Battle of Cancha Rayada or Surprise of Cancha Rayada) was fought in Chile between South American patriots and Spanish royalists, during the Osorio's campaign in the South American wars of independence. The result was a defeat for the patriot forces, weeks later the patriots take their rematch at the Battle of Maipú.

== Background ==
In March 1818, the royalist forces concentrated and fortified in Talca with around five thousand men under Brigadier Mariano Osorio, while the independentist forces of around seven thousand men formed by the United Army were taking positions at the Cancha Rayada plains, about seven kilometers away. Argentine general José de San Martín, fearing an attack on his flank, ordered a change of position of the troops.

Knowing their disadvantage in number and cavalry, the Spanish General Osorio was not eager to engage in battle either, remaining content with fortifying Talca. However, after a suggestion from Colonel José Ordóñez a confrontation was decided upon, under Ordoñez' command.

== The battle ==
The Spanish attacked at 19:30, when the last thing the patriots expected was a battle. In a bold move, Ordoñez made the kind of attack San Martín had most feared: circumventing the city and making a surprise attack at night behind the vanguard where the patriot forces were still taking positions. The surprise attack happened before the patriot army had re-positioned itself, and was a directed at the battalion under General Bernardo O'Higgins command, near San Martín's position. Soon, the vanguard soldiers dispersed, leaving O'Higgins in a bad position; his horse was shot dead and he was wounded in one arm.

In an uncharacteristic move, instead of ordering retreat San Martín held the position, which made more patriot soldiers flee under enemy fire, leaving their weapons and supplies behind. After the initial disorder, however, he ordered retreat. The rear and reserves had already re-positioned, somewhat withstanding the attack, but had no-one in command, since their chief, Colonel Hilarión de la Quintana, had left for headquarters to receive orders after the re-position and had not yet returned. Colonel Juan Gregorio de Las Heras took command, and led the men during the retreat, while trying to recover as much artillery and weapons as possible. San Martín and O'Higgins (who were also retreating at full speed) were being closely chased by royalist forces.

== Aftermath ==
By March 21, the decimated patriot forces of around three and half thousand men reunited in San Fernando, while news of the defeat reached Santiago. Rumors of deaths of O'Higgins and San Martín were spreading, and an exodus from Santiago to Mendoza began. Regarding the battle, San Martín sent the following message: Camping the army under my command in the outskirts of Talca, it was attacked by the enemy, and suffered an almost generalized disbanding which forced me to retreat. I'm reuniting the troops right now, with happy results, as I'm already counting 4,000 men from Curicó to Pelequén.

The battle (which was the only defeat the campaign had suffered) resulted in around 150 killed, and two hundred taken prisoner. Several hundred had deserted, the whole artillery of the Argentine side was lost along with considerable numbers of horses, mules, and weapons from both the Chilean and Argentine parts of the army. Despite the royalist victory, the action proved devastating to their side: two hundred soldiers had been killed, three hundred men captured and around six hundred had deserted, a total comprising more than half the two thousand men that had charged into the battle.
