= Su esposa diurna =

1944 film by Enrique Cahen Salaberry

- Directed by: Enrique Cahen Salaberry
- Written by: Alejandro Verbitsky and Emilio Villalba Welsh
- Starring: Alejandro Flores; Jacqueline Dumont; Francisco Álvarez; Nury Montsé
- Cinematography: Antonio Merayo
- Edited by: Nicolás Proserpio
- Music by: Mario Maurano
- Production company: Argentina Sono Film
- Release date: May 12, 1944
- Running time: 74 minutes
- Country: Argentina
- Language: Spanish

Su esposa diurna (English: Your Daytime Wife) is a 1944 Argentine romantic comedy film of the classical era of Argentine cinema, directed by Enrique Cahen Salaberry. It stars Alejandro Flores, Jacqueline Dumont, Francisco Álvarez and Nury Montsé. The script was written by Alejandro Verbitsky and Emilio Villalba Welsh.

== Plot ==
An entomologist and a gym teacher who pretend to be married to get a grant and go on a scientific expedition end up falling in love.

== Cast ==
- Alejandro Flores
- Jacqueline Dumont
- Francisco Álvarez
- Nury Montsé
- Adrián Cúneo
- Carlos Morganti
- Enrique Chaico
- Olimpio Bobbio
- Alberto Terrones

== Reception ==
La Nación found the film entertaining and funny and critic Roland opined in Diario Crítica that the film "has the uncommon quality of its permanent ameneity".
