= Father Cigarette (1946 film) =

1946 film

- Directed by: Roberto de Ribón
- Written by: Carlos Arniches (play); Jorge Jantus
- Production company: Chile Films
- Release date: 1946
- Country: Chile
- Language: Spanish

Father Cigarette (Spanish: El padre Pitillo) is a 1946 Chilean comedy film directed by Roberto de Ribón. There is also a 1955 Spanish version, directed by Juan de Orduña.

== Plot ==
The story follows Rosita, a girl who is tormented by her problems and seeks support from the priest in her village, known as Father Cigarette. She was seduced by the town's charming man and has no choice but to seek refuge with the priest, who, from his particular point of view, will try to guide her.

== Cast ==
- Lucho Córdova as Padre Pitillo
- Conchita Buxón
- Chela Bon
- Nicanor Molinare

== Bibliography ==
- Jacqueline Mouesca. Erase una vez el cine: diccionario-- realizadores, actrices, actores, películas, capítulos del cine mundial y latinoamericano. Lom Ediciones, 2001.
