= Bernardo de Vera =

Argentine-born Chilean politician

Bernardo de Vera (1780 – 27 August 1827) was an Argentine-born Chilean politician. He wrote the first national anthem of Chile, and served as president of the Chamber of Deputies of Chile.
