= Francisco Marcó del Pont =

Spanish soldier and the last Governor of Chile

His Excellency Francisco Marcó del Pont KOS
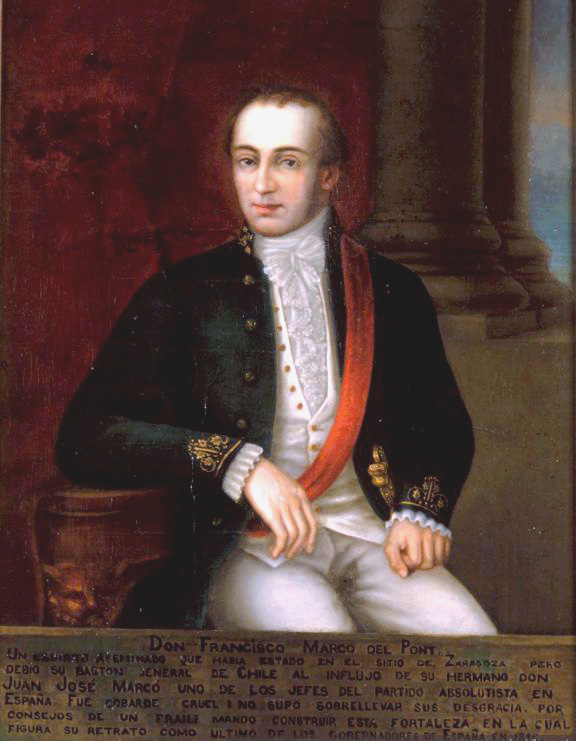

Royal Governor of Chile
- In office December 26, 1815 – February 12, 1817
- Monarch: Ferdinand VII
- Preceded by: Mariano Osorio
- Succeeded by: José Ordóñez

Personal details
- Born: 25 June 1770 Vigo, Galicia, Spain
- Died: 19 May 1819 (aged 48) La Estanzuela, San Luis Province, Argentina
- Profession: Field marshal

Francisco Casimiro Marcó del Pont y Ángel (Latin American Spanish: [fɾanˈsisko maɾˈko ðel pond]; June 25, 1770 – May 19, 1819) was a Spanish soldier and the last Governor of Chile. He was one of the main figures of the Chilean independence process, being the final Spaniard to rule as Royal Governor of Chile from 1815 to 1817, when he was deposed and captured by the patriot forces after the Battle of Chacabuco.

== Early career ==
Marcó del Pont was born in Vigo, Galicia, Spain, the son of Buenaventura Marcó del Pont y Porí and of Juana Ángel Díaz y Méndez. He began a brilliant military career by joining the Infantry Regiment of Zaragoza. He served with distinction during the Peninsular War against Napoleon, achieving the rank of General before being taken prisoner during the capture of Valencia in 1809. He was tried by a French military tribunal and sentenced to death, with the possibility of saving his life by swearing loyalty to the invading power. He refused and thus won the respect of Joseph Bonaparte, who commuted his sentence to life imprisonment.

In 1814, Marcó del Pont was liberated as a consequence of the general retreat of the French forces from Spain. He was still quite young, being under 45 years old, when he was promoted to the rank of Field Marshal, and appointed military chief and governor of Tortosa. In September 1815 he was promoted to Captain General and Royal Governor of Chile, where he arrived to take over his position on December 26 of the same year.

== Governor of Chile ==
In 1815 Marco del Pont was named Governor of the then-Spanish colony of Chile, arriving at Valparaíso at the end of the year. Once he assumed the head of the Reconquista government he sent spies to Cuyo in order to obtain information about the Army of the Andes being amassed by exiled pro-independence leaders such as Bernardo O'Higgins in the Argentine province of Mendoza. This army, under José de San Martín, would later cross the Andes to liberate Chile. Internally, he sought to solidify Spanish control through the brutal repression of all those associated with the independence movement who had remained in Chile. A number of notables were deported to the barren Juan Fernández Islands, and others suffered the depredations of group of soldiers led by the infamous captain Vicente San Bruno.

Marco del Pont's rule ended on February 12, 1817, when the defeat of the Royalist forces under the command of Rafael Maroto in the Battle of Chacabuco allowed the patriot forces to enter the capital. The governor Marco del Pont tried to escape to Valparaíso to catch a transport leaving for Peru, but he was intercepted by an advance column of the patriot army at an hacienda called "Las Tablas" near El Quisco. After his capture, he was interviewed by San Martín, who sent him to Mendoza and later San Luis. His days ended after a final move to the hacienda of Pedro Ignacio de Mujica in La Estanzuela, when he died in prison in 1819.

== Additional information ==
=== See also ===
- Chilean War of Independence
- Mariano Osorio
- Rafael Maroto
- Vicente San Bruno
- Antonio de Quintanilla
- Juan Francisco Meneses
- Ventura Miguel Marcó del Pont

=== Sources ===
- Barros Arana, Diego (1855). Historia Jeneral de la Independencia de Chile (in Spanish). Vol. I–IV. Santiago, Chile: Imprenta del Ferrocarril.
- Barros Arana, Diego (1884–1902). Historia Jeneral de Chile (in Spanish). Vol. I–XVI. Santiago, Chile: Rafael Jover. ISBN 9780598482334.
- Castedo, Leopoldo (1954). Resumen de la Historia de Chile de Francisco Antonio Encina (in Spanish). Vol. 2. Santiago, Chile: Empresa Editora Zig-Zag.
- Encina, Francisco Antonio (1940–1952). Historia de Chile: desde la prehistoria hasta 1891 (in Spanish). Vol. I–XX. Santiago, Chile: Editorial Nascimento.
- Gay, Claudio (1856). Historia de la Independencia Chilena (in Spanish). Vol. I & II. Paris, France: Imprenta de E. Thunot y Cia.
- Herring, Hubert (1968). A History of Latin America. New York: Alfred A Knopf.
- Prago, Albert (1970). The Revolutions in Spanish America. New York: The Macmillan Company.
- Zapiola, José (1872–1876). Recuerdos de treinta años (1810-1840) (in Spanish). Vol. I & II. Santiago, Chile: Imprenta de El Independiente. p. 310.

Government offices
Preceded by Mariano Osorio	Royal Governor of Chile; 1815–1818	Succeeded by José Ordóñez (As Captain General)
