= Mariano Osorio =

Spanish general (1777–1819)

His Excellency Mariano Osorio
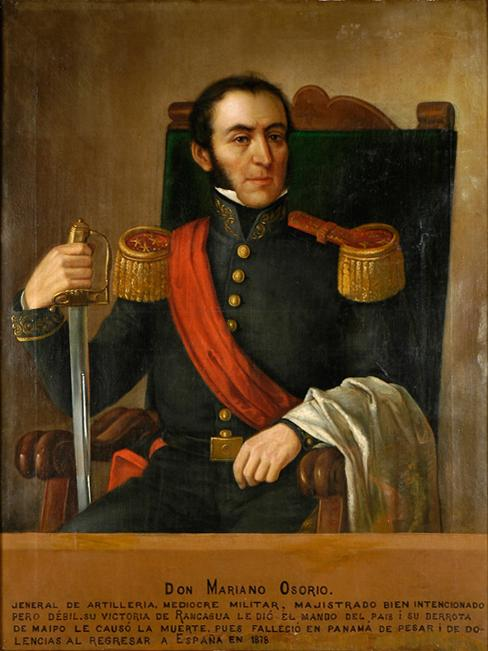

Royal Governor of Chile
- In office January 4, 1818 – April 5, 1818
- Monarch: Ferdinand VII
- Preceded by: José Ordóñez
- Succeeded by: Position Abolished
- In office October 10, 1814 – December 26, 1815
- Monarch: Ferdinand VII
- Preceded by: Gabino Gaínza y Fernández de Medrano (As Captain General)
- Succeeded by: Francisco Marcó del Pont

Personal details
- Born: 1777 Seville, Spain
- Died: 1819 (aged 41–42) Havana, Cuba
- Spouse: Joaquina de la Pezuela
- Profession: Brigadier General

Military service
- Allegiance: Spain
- Battles/wars: Peninsular War; Chilean War of Independence; Battle of Rancagua; Second Battle of Cancha Rayada; Battle of Maipú

Mariano de Osorio (Latin American Spanish: [maˈɾjano ðe oˈsoɾjo]; 1777–1819) was a Spanish general and Governor of Chile, from 1814 to 1815.

== Early career ==
Osorio was born in Seville, Spain. He joined the Spanish army and as many of his contemporaries, his military career began during the Spanish Peninsular War in 1808 as an artillery general, as well as the professor for mathematics in the military school. In 1810, was appointed head of the military factory of Catalonia. In 1812, was destined to the Royal Army in Peru.

In 1812 he resettled in Peru, where he married Joaquina de la Pezuela, daughter of Peruvian Viceroy Joaquín de la Pezuela. In the Disaster of Rancagua (1814) he was able to defeat the forces of Bernardo O'Higgins and José Miguel Carrera. In the same year he became the Governor of Chile.

=== Chile ===
With Osorio's victory at Rancagua, the period known as "reconquest" (Reconquista) of Chile had begun. Osorio sought to reinstate order and justice and with military measures he prevented the onslaught of the insurgents.

In 1816 he returned to Lima and Francisco Marcó del Pont was made new Governor of Chile. When the Spaniards lost the Battle of Chacabuco, he returned to Chile. There he succeeded in securing victory in the Second Battle of Cancha Rayada on March 18, 1818. At this battle O'Higgins's arm was injured.

The Battle of Maipu, however, was a major defeat for the Spaniards, and it signified the end of the Spanish authority in almost all of Chile, with the exception of the island of Chiloé and the city of Valdivia.

Osorio proceeded to Cuba, where he died in 1819 of malaria.

Government offices
Preceded by Mateo de Toro Zambrano	Royal Governor of Chile; 1814–1815	Succeeded by Francisco Marcó del Pont
Military offices
Preceded by Gabino Gaínza	Captain General of Chile; 1814–1815	Succeeded by Francisco Marcó del Pont (As Royal Governor)
Preceded by José Ordóñez	Captain General of Chile; 1818	Succeeded by Position Abolished
