= Battle of Chacabuco =

1817 battle of the Chilean and Argentine wars of independence

- Part of the Chilean War of Independence and the Argentine War of Independence
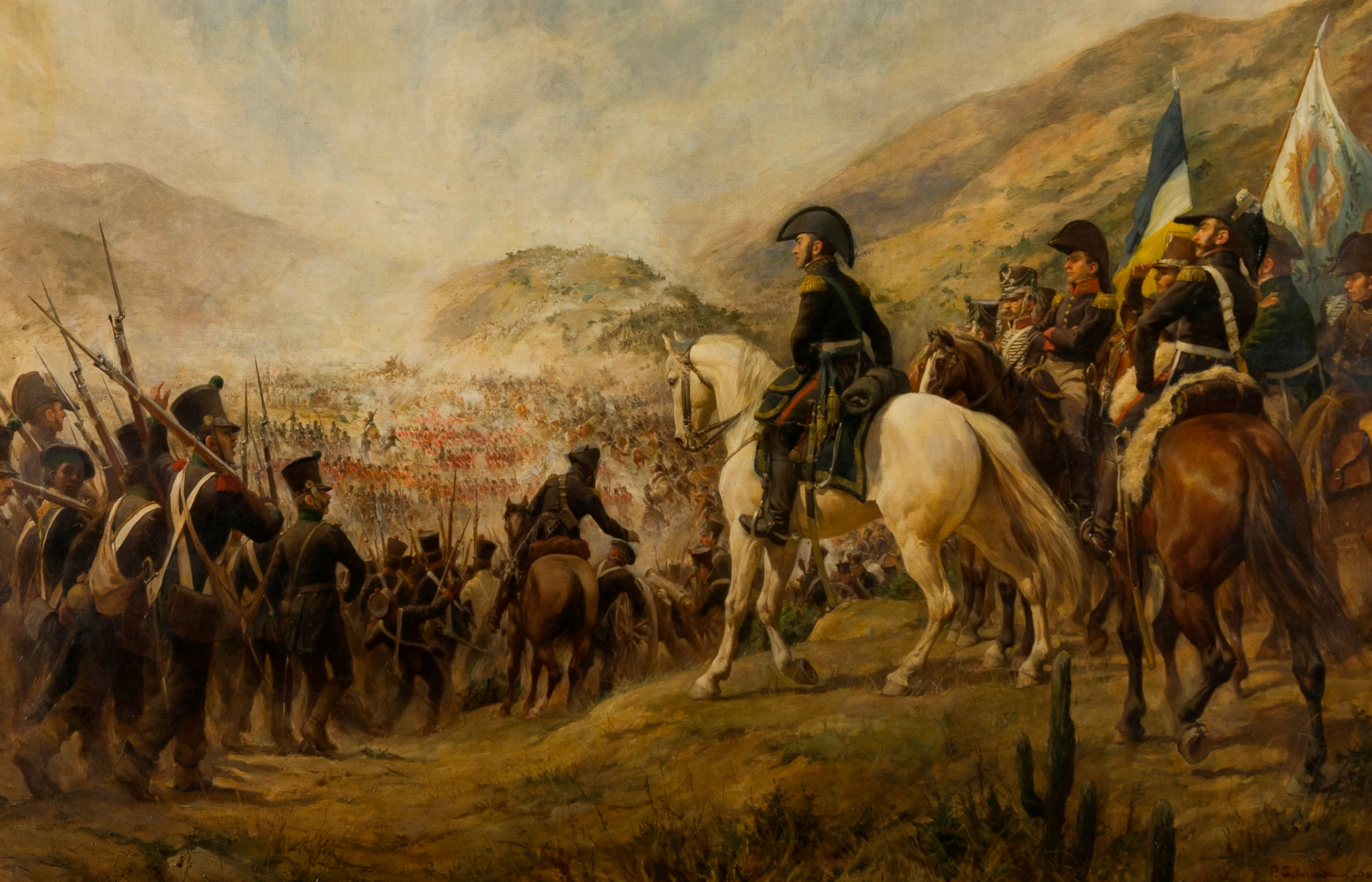
- Battle of Chacabuco; Pedro Subercaseaux, 1908
Date	February 12, 1817
Location	Chacabuco Province, Santiago Metropolitan Region 32.993056°S 70.683889°W
Result	Victory for the Army of the Andes

Belligerents
(Argentina) United Provinces (Chile) Chilean patriots	Kingdom of Spain and the Indies

Commanders and leaders
(Argentina) José de San Martín (Argentina) Miguel E. Soler (Chile) Bernardo O'Higgins	(Spain) Rafael Maroto

Units involved
Army of the Andes	Royal Army of Chile

Strength
3,600 – 4,000 men (Infantry and Cavalry); 9 artillery	1,400–2,450 Infantry; 5 artillery Spaniards <160 men

Casualties and losses
100 killed or wounded	500 killed or wounded 600 captured
- Location within Chile

The Battle of Chacabuco, fought during the Chilean War of Independence, took place on February 12, 1817. The Army of the Andes, from the United Provinces of the Río de la Plata and led by Captain–General José de San Martín, defeated a Spanish force commanded by Rafael Maroto. This victory was a significant defeat for the Captaincy General of Chile, the royalist government established after the division of the Viceroyalty of Peru.

== Background ==
In 1814, after helping establish a popularly elected congress in Argentina, José de San Martín began considering how to expel the Spanish royalists from South America entirely. He recognized that the first step would be to drive them out of Chile, and with this in mind, he began recruiting and equipping an army. In under two years, he had assembled a force of approximately 6,000 men, 1,200 horses, and 22 cannons.

On January 17, 1817, San Martín set out with this force and commenced the challenging crossing of the Andes. Thanks to his careful planning, the royalist forces in Chile were misled into defending against threats that did not exist, allowing his crossing to go unchallenged. However, despite this strategic advantage, the Army of the Andes, as San Martín's force was known, suffered severe losses during the crossing, losing as much as one-third of its men and more than half of its horses. Upon reaching Chile, San Martín allied with Chilean patriot Bernardo O'Higgins, who commanded his own army.

As the patriot forces advanced, the royalists rushed northward to confront them. A force of around 1,500 men, led by Brigadier Rafael Maroto, moved to block San Martín's advance at Chacabuco, a valley near Santiago. Facing the crumbling state of the royalist forces, Maroto initially proposed abandoning the capital and retreating south, where they could regroup and gather resources for a renewed campaign. During a military conference called by Royal Governor Field Marshal Casimiro Marcó del Pont on February 8, Maroto's strategy was adopted. However, the following morning, the Captain General reversed the decision, ordering Maroto to prepare for battle at Chacabuco.

The night before the battle, Antonio de Quintanilla, who would later distinguish himself in the defense of Chiloé, privately expressed his doubts about the strategy. He suggested that given the insurgents' position, the royalist forces should retreat a few leagues toward the hills of Colina. "Maroto overheard this conversation from a nearby chamber, but either couldn't or refused to listen due to his pride and self-importance. With his notorious hoarse voice, he called an attendant and decreed a general order, threatening death to anyone who suggested retreat."

Maroto's task was to delay San Martín, knowing that additional royalist reinforcements were en route from Santiago. San Martín, aware of this, chose to launch an attack while he still held a numerical advantage.

== Prelude ==
San Martín received numerous reports on the Spanish plans from a spy disguised as a roto, a poverty-stricken Chilean peasant. The roto informed him that the Spanish general, Marcó, was aware of fighting in the mountains and had ordered his army to "run to the field," referring to Chacabuco. The spy also revealed the strategy of General Rafael Maroto, leader of the Talavera Regiment and a force of up to 2,000 volunteers. Maroto’s plan was to take control of the mountainside and launch an attack against San Martín.

On February 11, three days before his intended attack, San Martín convened a war council to decide on a plan. Their primary objective was to capture the Chacabuco Ranch, the royalist headquarters located at the foot of the hills. San Martín decided to divide his 2,000 troops into two groups, sending them down two separate roads on either side of the mountain. The right contingent was led by Miguel Estanislao Soler, and the left by O’Higgins. The plan was for Soler to attack the royalist flanks while simultaneously surrounding their rear guard to prevent a retreat. San Martín anticipated that both leaders would launch their attacks simultaneously, forcing the royalists to fight on two fronts.

== Battle ==
San Martín sent his troops down the mountain starting at midnight on the 11th to prepare for an attack at dawn. By dawn, his troops were much closer to the royalists than anticipated, but they fought hard and heroically. Meanwhile, Soler's troops had to descend a narrow path that proved long and arduous, taking longer than expected. General O’Higgins, supposedly overcome with passion upon seeing his homeland, abandoned the planned attack and charged ahead with his 1,500 men. What exactly transpired during this part of the battle is fiercely debated. O’Higgins claimed the royalists had stopped retreating and began advancing toward his troops. He argued that if he had ordered his men to retreat back up the narrow path, they would have been picked off one by one. San Martín, noticing O’Higgins' premature advance, ordered Soler to charge the royalist flank, relieving pressure on O’Higgins and allowing his troops to hold their ground.

The ensuing firefight lasted into the afternoon. The tide turned for the Army of the Andes as Soler captured a key royalist artillery position. At this point, the royalists set up a defensive square around the Chacabuco Ranch. O’Higgins charged the center of the royalist position, while Soler moved into position behind the royalists, cutting off any chance of retreat. O’Higgins and his men overwhelmed the royalist troops, and when the royalists attempted to flee, Soler's forces cut them off and pushed toward the ranch. Hand-to-hand combat ensued in and around the ranch until every royalist soldier was either killed or taken captive. Five hundred royalist soldiers were killed and 600 were taken prisoner. The Army of the Andes lost only twelve men in battle, though an additional 120 died from wounds sustained during the fighting. Maroto managed to escape, thanks to the speed of his horse, though he was slightly injured.

== Aftermath ==
The remaining royalist troops retreated to the southern tip of Chile, where they established a small enclave, forming what was essentially a mini Spanish Chile. They were reinforced by sea and continued to pose a threat to the Chilean nation until they were ultimately forced to withdraw by sea to Lima. Interim governor Francisco Ruiz-Tagle presided over an assembly that initially designated San Martín as governor. However, San Martín declined the position, calling for a new assembly, which appointed O'Higgins as Supreme Director of Chile. This marked the beginning of the "Patria Nueva" period in Chile's history.

The aftermath of the battle had several significant outcomes:

1. Reclamation of Santiago:

- After the battle, the patriot forces re-entered Santiago, the capital of Chile. Although San Martín was offered the position of Supreme Director, he declined and instead placed O'Higgins in the post. O'Higgins served as Supreme Director until 1823.

2. Beginning of Spanish Expulsion:

- The victory at Chacabuco marked the beginning of the expulsion of Spanish forces from Chile, a process completed the following year at the Battle of Maipú. This victory set the stage for Chile's eventual independence from Spanish rule.

3. Boost to Independence Movement:

- The Battle of Chacabuco was a key military encounter in Chile's struggle for independence. It significantly boosted the morale of the pro-independence Army of the Andes, furthering the cause of independence in the region.

4. Continental Significance:

- The battle was not only crucial for Chile but also had broader significance for the continent. It contributed to the larger movement of liberation from Spanish colonial rule across South America. San Martín's role in the battle and Chile's subsequent liberation added to his legacy as a key figure in the continent's fight for freedom from Spanish rule.

The Battle of Chacabuco thus served as a turning point in the Chilean War of Independence, laying the groundwork for future victories and the eventual liberation of Chile and other regions from Spanish colonial rule.

Several ships of the Chilean Navy have been named after the battle.

== See also ==
- Chilean Independence
