= Callao (disambiguation) =

Callao is a seaside city, port and region in the Lima metropolitan area of Peru.

Callao may also refer to:

== Places ==
- Avenida Callao ('Callao Avenue'), Buenos Aires, Argentina
  - Callao (Line B Buenos Aires Underground)
  - Callao (Line D Buenos Aires Underground)
- Callao District, Callao Region, Peru
  - Roman Catholic Diocese of Callao, Peru
- Callao Cave, Peñablanca, Cagayan province, Philippines
- Callao Square, Madrid, Spain
  - Callao (Madrid Metro)
- Callao, Missouri, United States
- Callao Township, Macon County, Missouri, United States
- Callao, Utah, United States
- Callao, Virginia, United States
- El Callao Municipality, Bolivar State, Venezuela
  - El Callao, Venezuela

== Ships ==
- Spanish gunboat Callao, 1888–1898
- USS Callao, the name of several American ships

== Other uses ==
- "Callao" (song), by Anna Carina, 2019
- Callao, a song by Wisin & Yandel from the 2018 album Los Campeones del Pueblo
- Pilsen Callao, a beer by Backus and Johnston Brewery
- National University of Callao, in Callao province, Peru

== See also ==
- Callao affair, 1820
- Battle of Callao (1838)
- Battle of Callao, 1866
- Blockades of Callao, several events
- Siege of Callao (disambiguation), several events
