= Historic Centre of Callao =

Historic site in Callao, Peru

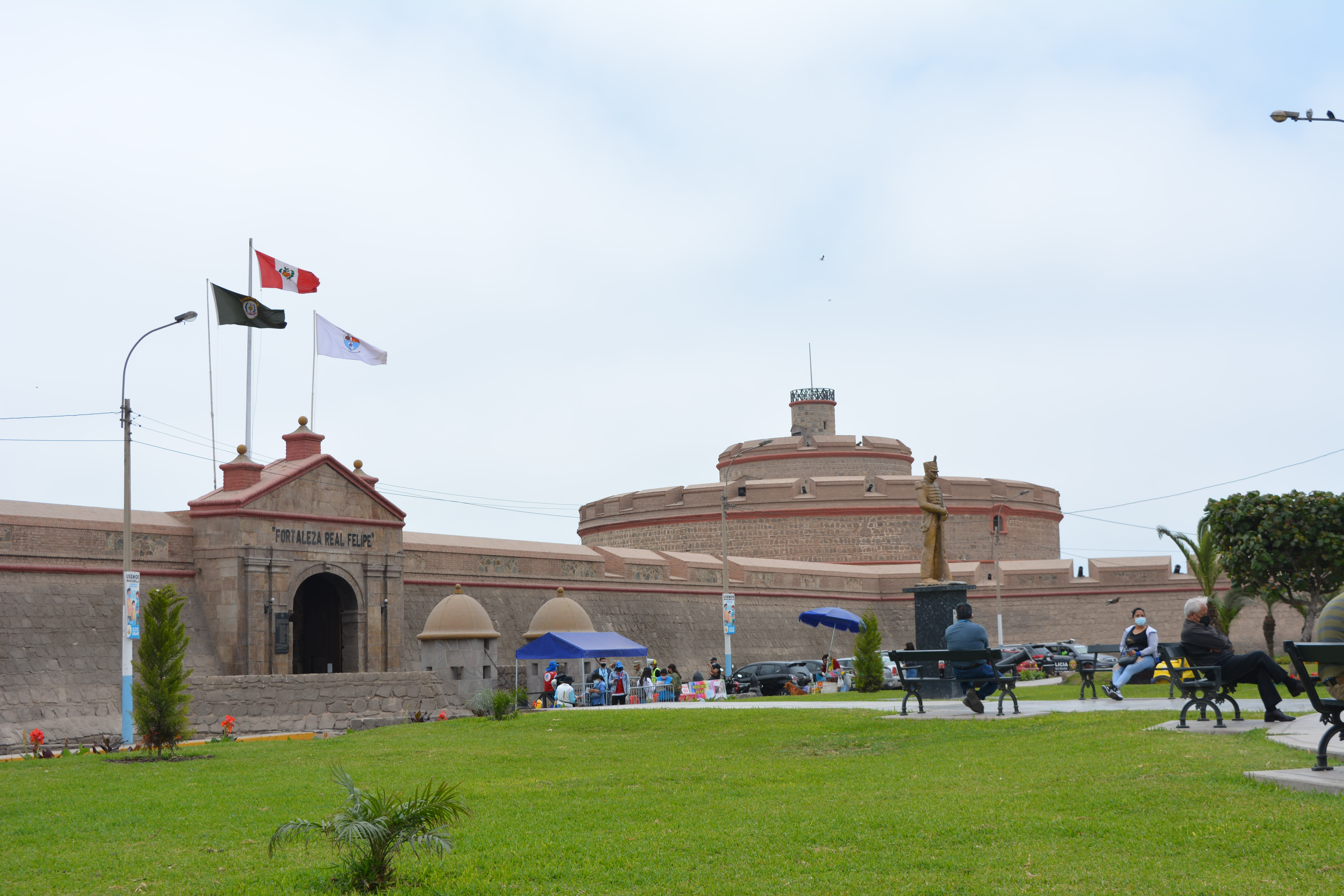
- Front view of Real Felipe Fortress
- Interactive map of Historic Centre of Callao
- Country: Peru
- Department: Callao
- Province: Callao
- District: Callao

The Historic Centre of Callao (Spanish: Centro histórico del Callao) is the historic city centre of the Peruvian city of Callao, located west of the country's capital, Lima. The site was included within the larger area declared a Monumental Zone by the Peruvian government in 1972, which was expanded in 1990 to include part of Chucuito neighbourhood.

== History ==
The city was founded by the Spanish in 1537, two years after the foundation of Lima. During the Peruvian War of Independence, its strategic location made it the target of a number of blockades and sieges. It was first successfully blockaded by José de San Martín's naval forces in 1821, followed by a pro-royalist uprising in 1824 which led to a two-year siege of Real Felipe Fortress, where the aforementioned troops had established themselves until their capitulation in 1826, ending the Spanish Empire's presence in South America. In 1838, during the War of the Confederation, it was again besieged by the United Restoration Army—made up of Chileans and Peruvian dissidents who opposed the existence of the Peru–Bolivian Confederation—whose smaller numbers forced them to retreat with the advance of the Confederate Army into Lima. It was the site of the 1866 battle between Peru and Spain during the Chincha Islands War, where Spain was defeated.

The site was included within the larger area declared a Monumental Zone by the Peruvian government in 1972, limited by Roca, Adolfo King, Huancavelica, Manco Cápac, Paraguay, Pedro Ruiz, Estados Unidos and Gamarra streets, as well as Dos de Mayo, Sáenz Peña and Buenos Aires avenues. It was expanded in 1990 to include part of Chucuito neighbourhood, gaining a border with La Punta District. In 2000, the mainland of La Punta (with the exception of the Naval School) was also declared a Monumental Zone separate from that of Callao.

The neighbourhood of Chucuito traditionally served as the home of Spanish and Italian fishermen and their families since the 18th century, and is currently known for its colourful façades.

== List of sites ==
List of Landmarks included within the Monumental Zone
Name	Location	Notes	Photo
Abtao Museum	Port of Callao	Originally an Abtao-class submarine of the Peruvian Navy in service from 1953 to 1999, it participated in the rescue efforts of the BAP Pacocha submarine and now serves as a museum ship since 2004.	
Cámara de Comercio Callao	Plaza San Martín	Built from 1966 to 1969, the thirteen-storey building was designed by architect Enrique Seoane Ros to house Callao's chamber of commerce.	—N/a
Casa Ronald	Independencia 246	The five-storey neoclassical building, which features a passageway of the same name, was commissioned by businessman Guillermo Ronald y Padilla, who inaugurated it in 1928. Its interior features a number of stores, iron gates and marbled floors.	
Casa Valega	Jr. Gálvez & Independencia	The building dates back to the second half of the 19th century and is named after the prominent Italian business family whose patriarch, Felix Valega, arrived to Callao's port in 1806.	
Diario El Callao	Jr. Pedro Ruiz Gallo 141	The building is named after the newspaper of the same name, serving as its headquarters. Founded on November 2, 1883, by Darío Arrús, is the second oldest in the country.	
Naval Museum of Peru	Av. Jorge Chávez 123	Administered by the Peruvian Navy, it was established in 1958 and opened in 1962, featuring exhibits dedicated to the Viceregal and Republican eras, as well as a section dedicated to the War of the Pacific.	
Plaza Grau		Formerly known as the Plaza de la Constitución and later as the Plaza de la Victoria, it is an area formed by two squares: the smaller and oldest is known as the Plaza Emilio San Martín—named after a soldier killed on May 25, 1880, during the War of the Pacific—while the larger and newest is named after Miguel Grau. The older square was the original square dedicated to Grau, with its construction ordered in 1891.	
Plaza Independencia		Inaugurated in 1885, the square's name honours the memory of those killed in the War of Independence. It features a large fountain that dates back to 1866, preceding the existence of the square.	
Plaza José Gálvez		Originally known as the Plaza del Mercado and later as the Plaza Dos de Mayo, it is named after José Gálvez Egúsquiza, who served as Minister of War and Navy until his death in the 1866 battle against Spain. His statue, the work of Ulderico Tenderini, is located in the middle of the square, having been moved from its original location at the Plaza Matriz. It was remodelled on August 21, 1936.	
Plaza San Martín		Located in front of the Plaza Matriz, it features a statue of Eddie Palmieri.	
Real Felipe Fortress	Plaza Independencia	Designed by Louis Godin and named after King Philip V, its construction began on January 21, 1747, to defend the coastal city from pirate incursions. During and since the War of Independence, it has been a notable site of a number of battles and military advances.	
Sport Boys	Jr. Pedro Ruiz Gallo 153	The building is the current headquarters of the football club of the same name, prominently featuring its emblem and painted in its colour.	
Saint Joseph's Cathedral	Plaza Matriz	The neoclassical church was designed by Antonio Dañino and completed in 1893, being restored after the earthquake of 1970. It was made the main church of the Roman Catholic Diocese of Callao, created in 1967 by Pope Paul VI.	

== See also ==
- Historic Centre of Lima
