= Blockades of Callao =

Blockades of Callao include:

- Blockade of Callao (1816), occurred between January 21 and 28, 1816, during Guillermo Brown's corsair expedition.
- First blockade of Callao, occurred between February 28 and May 3, 1819 during Thomas Cochrane's campaign.
- Second blockade of Callao, occurred between September 28 and November 6, 1819 during the Cochrane campaign.
- Third blockade of Callao, occurred between October 30, 1820 and September 19, 1821 during Cochrane's operations in support of the Liberating Expedition of Peru's siege during the Peruvian War of Independence.
- Fourth blockade of Callao, caused by the recovery of the port of Callao by royalist troops. Interrupted by a Spanish expedition on October 7.
- Callao mutiny, February 5, 1824.
- Battle of Callao (1824), occurred on October 7, 1824, and interrupted the previous siege.
- Fifth blockade of Callao, occurred between January 7, 1825 and January 23, 1826 by a combined squad of Chileans, Colombians and Peruvians led, at different times, by Martin Guisse, Manuel Blanco Encalada and Juan Illingworth. It ended with the definitive capitulation of the fortress.
- Blockade of Callao (1838), occurred between August 17 and November 24, 1838 during the War of the Confederation.
- Battle of Callao, occurred on May 2, 1866 during the Chincha Islands War.
- Blockade of Callao, occurred between April 10, 1880 and January 16, 1881 during the War of the Pacific.

== See also ==
- Battle of Callao, 1866
- Battle of Callao (1838)
- Siege of Callao (disambiguation)
