= Callao uprising =

1824 uprising in Peru

- Part of the Peruvian War of Independence
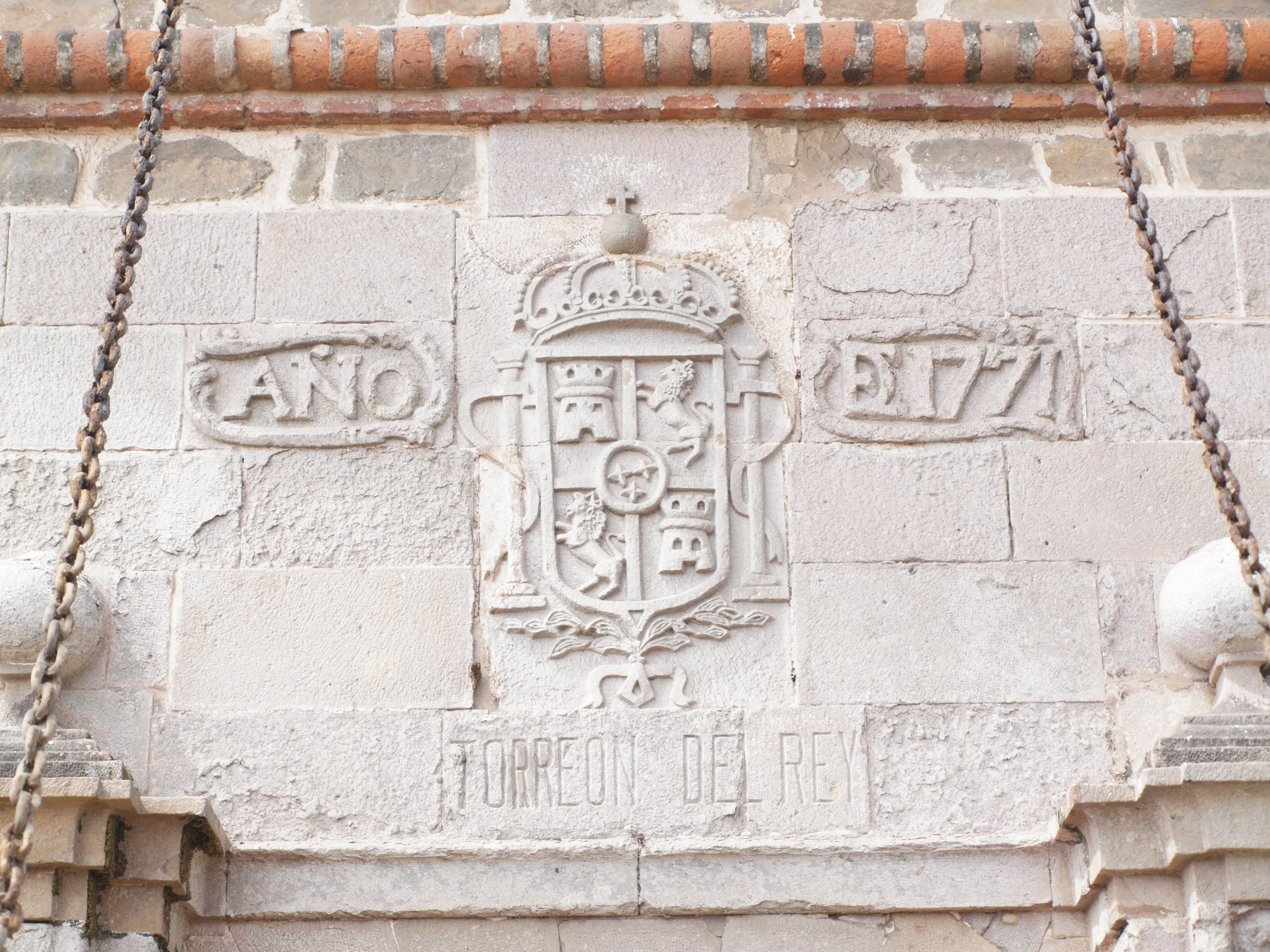
- Royal emblem at the fortress
Date	5 February 1824
Location	Real Felipe Fortress, Callao
Result	Royalist Army victory; Lima evacuated to Callao; Start the Second siege of Callao

Belligerents
Spain	Republic of Peru: Co-belligerents: United Provinces; Chile; Gran Colombia

Commanders and leaders
J. M. Casariego	Rudecindo Alvarado

Units involved
Army of the Andes renamed Loyalty Regiment (Note: Formerly the "Regiment of the Río de la Plata" (Spanish: Regimiento Río de la Plata), upon switching sides it became the "Loyalty Regiment" (Spanish: Regimiento de la lealtad), also known as the "Real Felipe Regiment" (Spanish: Regimiento del Real Felipe) of the Spanish Army.)	United Liberating Army; (United Provinces of the Río de la Plata) Remnants of the Mounted Grenadiers

The Callao uprising (Spanish: Sublevación del Callao), also known as the Callao mutiny (Spanish: Motín del Callao), took place on February 5, 1824, in the Real Felipe Fortress in Callao, during the campaigns of Simón Bolívar in the Peruvian War of Independence, when Chilean, Colombian, Peruvian and Argentine units of the Army of the Andes rose up and crossed to the Spanish side, ending the unit's existence.

Except for a squadron of the Mounted Grenadiers Regiment who did not switch sides, the event meant the almost complete disappearance of the forces brought to Peru by General José de San Martín. General Cirilo Correa then assumed command of the remains of the Andes Division of the Liberating Expedition, reduced to officers without units under their command and a squadron of the Mounted Grenadiers Regiment that fought in the battles of Junín and Ayacucho and was in the rearguard in the Battle of Corpahuaico, returning his men to Buenos Aires after the royalist capitulation in Ayacucho.

After the mutiny, the Chilean units were completely dissolved in Peru. On January 31, 1825, while the siege of Callao was still being held, Admiral Manuel Blanco Encalada negotiated with the royalist chief José Ramón Rodil the release of 16 Chilean officers who had been prisoners in the fortresses since the uprising of the garrison.

== See also ==
- Batallón Voltígeros de la Guardia, who switched sides to the Patriot side in 1820
- Second siege of Callao, which took place after the city was recaptured
