= José Luis Astigarraga Lizarralde =

Roman Catholic bishop

José Luis Astigarraga Lizarralde C.P.
- Vicar Apostolic of Yurimaguas
- Church: Catholic Church
- See: Apostolic Vicariate of Yurimaguas
- In office: 26 November 1991 – 17 December 2016
- Predecessor: Miguel Irízar Campos
- Successor: Jesús María Aristín Seco
- Other post: Titular Bishop of Buleliana (1991-2017)

Orders
- Ordination: 1 February 1964
- Consecration: 29 February 1992 by Luigi Dossena

Personal details
- Born: 4 May 1940 Azkoitia, Gipuzkoa, Spanish State
- Died: 20 January 2017 (aged 76)

José Luis Astigarraga Lizarralde C.P. (4 May 1940 – 20 January 2017) was a Roman Catholic bishop.

Ordained to the priesthood in 1964, Astigarraga Lizarralde served as bishop of the Apostolic Vicarate of Yurimaguas, Peru, from 1992 until 2016.

== See also ==
- Catholic Church in Peru
