= Buleliana =

Titular see in Tunisia

Buleliana was a civitas (town) and bishopric in Roman North Africa and remains a Latin Catholic titular see.

== History ==
The exact location of the town is not known but it was in the Sahel region of northern Tunisia.

Buleliana was among the municipalities of sufficient importance in the Roman province of Africa proconsularis and latter Byzacena to become a suffragan diocese in the papal sway. The town remained the seat of a Christian bishopric through the Roman, Vandal and Byzantine eras but faded like most after the 7th century advent of Islam.

While Mesnage assigns three bishops to the see, other authors dispute two assignations:

- Pancratius, Donatist (heretical) dissident in (393), alternatively assigned to the diocese of Baliana
- Flavianus, participant at the synod called in Carthage in 484 by king Huneric of the Vandal Kingdom on the Donatist schism
- Bonifacius, alternatively assigned to the diocese of Bavagaliana.

== Titular see ==
The diocese was nominally restored in 1989 as titular bishopric of Buleliana (Latin = Curiate Italian) / Bulelianen(sis) (Latin adjective) as a titular see of the Roman Catholic Church.

It has had the following incumbents, so far of the fitting Episcopal (lowest) rank:

- José Luis Astigarraga Lizarralde (Spain) (1991.11.26 – 2017.01.20) as Apostolic Vicar of Yurimaguas (Peru) (1991.11.26 – 2016.12.17) and on emeritate.
- John Đỗ Văn Ngân (2017.05.02 – 2021.01.16), as Auxiliary Bishop of Diocese of Xuân Lộc (Vietnam) (2017.05.02 – 2021.01.16).
- Deepak Valerian Tauro (2021.07.16 – ...), as Auxiliary Bishop of Delhi (2021.07.16 – ...).

== See also ==
- List of Catholic dioceses in Tunisia

== Sources and external links ==
- GCatholic

Bibliography

- Pius Bonifacius Gams, Series episcoporum Ecclesiae Catholicae, Leipzig 1931, p. 464
- J. Mesnage, L'Afrique chrétienne, Paris 1912, p. 185
- Stefano Antonio Morcelli, Africa christiana, Volume I, Brescia 1816, p. 107
