= Siege of Callao =

Siege of Callao may refer to:

- First siege of Callao, 1821, during the Peruvian War of Independence
- Second siege of Callao, 1824–1826, during the Peruvian War of Independence
- Third siege of Callao, 1838, during the War of the Confederation

== See also ==
- Blockades of Callao
