= El Callao (newspaper) =

Daily newspaper from Peru

- Subdecano de la Prensa Nacional
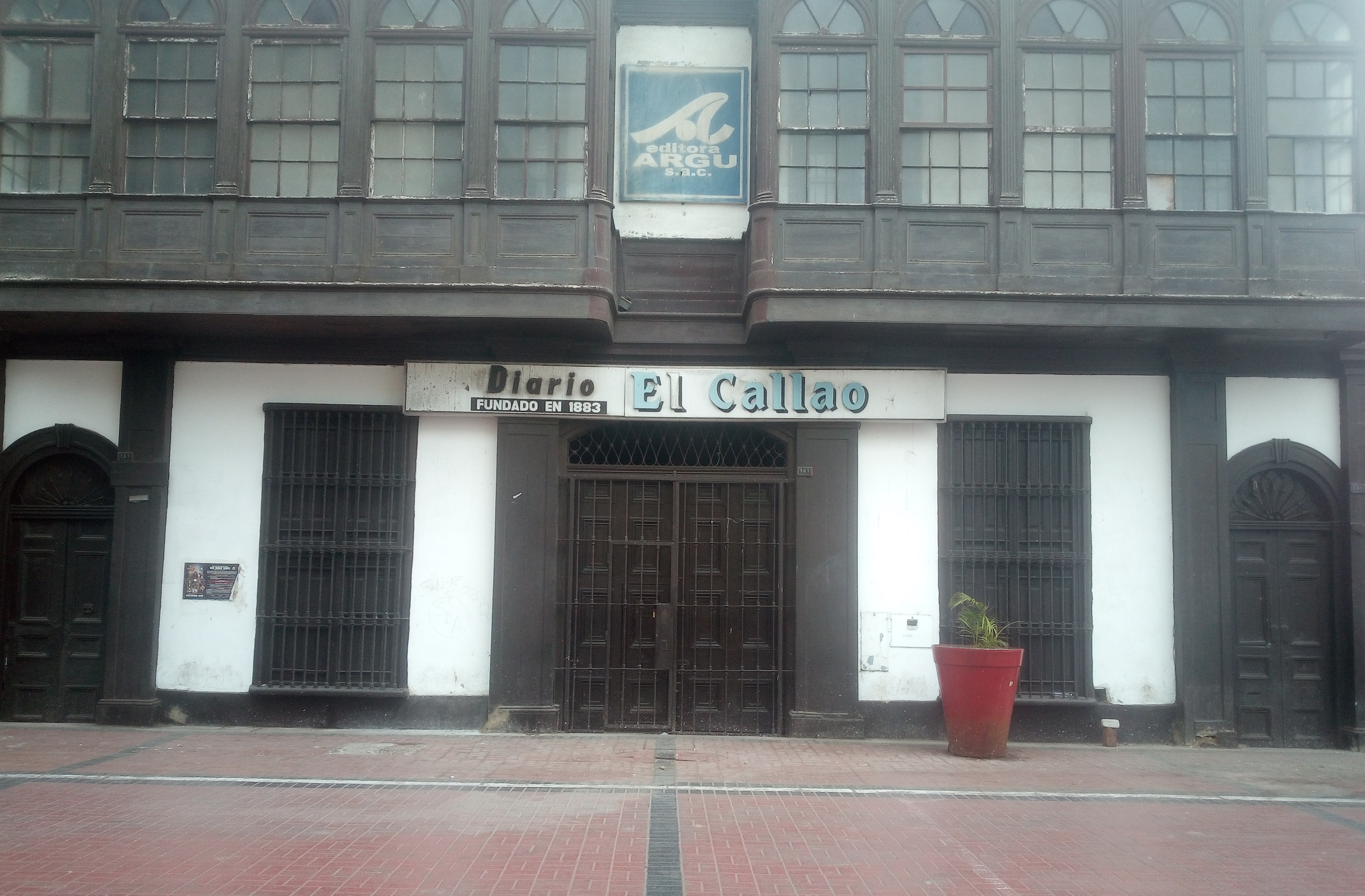
- Headquarters in Callao
- Type: Daily newspaper
- Founder: Manuel Darío Arrús
- President: Abraham Ramírez Lituma
- Editor: María Elena Cruzado Herencia
- Founded: November 2, 1883
- Language: Spanish
- Headquarters: Pedro Ruiz Gallo 141
- City: Callao
- Country: Peru
- Price: S/. 1.00

El Callao is a Peruvian newspaper published in Callao. Established in 1883 by journalist Manuel Darío Arrús, it is the second oldest newspaper in the country. Its headquarters are located at the Historic Centre of Callao.

== History ==
The newspaper was established by Manuel Darío Arrús, a journalist originally from Cuenca, Ecuador, who immigrated to Peru with his parents at a very young age and founded his own publishing house in 1877. He conceived the newspaper as a platform dedicated to the open discussion of ideas, including erroneous ones, as he believed they could nevertheless contribute to a "sincere search for truth."

The newspaper was shut down by several governments: the first such closure took place during the civil war between Andrés A. Cáceres and Nicolás de Piérola, also resulting in Arrús' imprisonment. It was again closed by the governments of Luis Miguel Sánchez Cerro and Manuel A. Odría. Its contributors included author Ricardo Palma, poet Emilio Siles, philosopher Alejandro Deustua, historian Teodoro Casana Robles, politicians Néstor Gambetta and Rafael Larco Herrera, among others.

== See also ==
- El Peruano, the country's oldest newspaper
