= Solís Uprising =

The Solís Uprising (Spanish: Levantamiento de Solís) was an unsuccessful military uprising in Galicia (Spain) in 1846. The soldiers executed after the defeat became known as the Martyrs of Carral (Spanish: Mártires de Carral).

== Context ==
The Moderate Decade (Spanish: Década Moderada, 1844-1854), during the reign of Isabel II of Spain, was a period in which the leading party, the Partido Moderado, developed a version of liberal conservatism, "liberal" only in the economic sense and in the rejection of absolute monarchy. General Ramón María Narváez was the strong man of the period, which was characterized by the curtailment of liberties and rights, and by administrative centralization.

== Uprising ==
On 2 April 1846, the Zamora Regiment stationed in the provincial capital of Lugo rebelled, led by Colonel Miguel Solís y Cuetos. Solís declared the dissolution of the Provincial Council and Deputation. Having gained the upper hand in Lugo, Solís addressed his troops. The final words of his speech make clear the intention of his uprising:

Galicians: all Spaniards: Long live the free Queen! Long live the Constitution! Out with the foreigners! Down with the Dictator Narváez! Down with the system of tribute!

In the following days, the uprising spread to other Galician cities, uniting the so-called "provincialists". On 15 April in Santiago de Compostela the Junta Superior del Reino de Galicia was declared. The Reino de Galicia—the Kingdom of Galicia, dating back to the Middle Ages——had been formally abolished thirteen years earlier under the 1833 territorial division of Spain, as were the other Iberian kingdoms that were reduced to a nominal status, having fallen under the domination of the Crown of Castile and since then been incorporated into a single Spanish Monarchy.

Solís and his collaborators sought to reclaim the liberties and rights abolished by Narváez and sought a more just treatment for Galicia; the University of Santiago de Compostela reconstituted the Batallón Literario, the student battalion that had last confronted the forces of Napoleonic France in the Peninsular War, viewed in Galicia as throughout Spain as a war of Spanish independence.

== Defeat ==
General Narváez, president of the Spanish Royal Council, minister of both State and War, sent troops under General Manuel Gutiérrez de la Concha, Captain General of Old Castile to put down the uprising. On 23 April, the Battle of Cacheiras began on the outskirts of Santiago de Compostela; the rebels were defeated by a vastly superior force.

Solís first took refuge in the San Martín Pinario Monastery, but surrendered himself later in the day. Three days later, a summary trial in Carral (A Coruña province) condemned him to death. The trial was held in this small town because of fear of Solís's sympathizers in Santiago and in A Coruña.

At dawn, Colonel Solís was brought to the churchyard of the parish church of Paleo near Carral, where he was executed by a firing squad. Commander Víctor Velasco and ten more officials were executed in the Forest of Rin, halfway between Carral and Paleo; they were buried the following day in the Paleo cemetery. Their tomb remains there; it has no inscription. The parish priest was present at the execution and called it a "Horrible spectacle. Sad memory."

== Posthumous honors ==
The twelve executed soldiers became known as the "Martyrs of Carral" ("Mártires de Carral"). Ten years later during the Progressive Biennium (Bienio Progresista, July 1854 – July 1856), the government declared them "Beneméritos de la Patria" (an honorific title; "Beneméritos" means "meritorious" and functions here as an adjectival noun). The Cortes granted them the Cruz del Valor y la Constancia ("Cross of Valor and Constancy") and decreed the erection of a monument.

That monument was not to be erected until 1904, when a monument was raised at the initiative of the Galician League of A Coruña. Designed by architect Juan Álvarez Mendoza of Lugo, it was built of granite quarried in Illó (Pontevedra province). It features the coat of arms of Galicia and an inscription in Galician reading: "To the martyrs of liberty killed 26 April 1846. Galician League of A Coruña" The monument is reminiscent of a Calvary, and prominently features a cross. This monument has been the scene of various memorial tributes, such as one on 26 April 1931 just after the founding of the Second Spanish Republic; a photograph of that event shows Manuel Lugrís Freire leading the attendees.

Manuel Murguía viewed Solís Uprising as a brief spring of 24 days in which illusion and progressivism confronted the government of Narváez that, despite defining itself as liberal and moderate, was opposed by the middle and lower bourgeoisie, many students and professors, and no small number of professionals who preferred republicanism. These were the first generation of Galician nationalism and regionalism—called at the time provincialismo or galleguismo—seeking a status for Galicia better than that of a "colony of the Court", in the words of Antolín Faraldo.
