= Pedro Marieluz Garces =

Pedro Marieluz Garcés (or Peter Marielux) (1780 – 23 September 1825) was a Roman Catholic priest who died as a martyr of the Seal of the Confessional.

Garcés was born in Tarma, Peru, in 1780. As a young man, he entered the order of the Camillians and was ordained a priest in 1805.

Later he became a military chaplain with the troops of the Spanish Royal Governor, Ramón Rodil. During the siege of the fortress Real Felipe in the city of Callao after the Battle of Ayacucho, there was a conspiracy made against Rodil by some of the Royal soldiers. The plot was discovered and Rodil sentenced the conspirators to death. They were allowed to confess to Marieluz before being shot. After the execution of the plotters, Rodil is said to have doubted whether he had convicted all members of the plot and, thinking that the executed ones would have revealed everything in confession to Marieluz, he tried to force the confessor to disclose to him what he had heard in the confessions by threatening him to be shot likewise, if he would not obey. But Marieluz remained steadfast and was executed on the evening of 23 September 1825, becoming a martyr in the eyes of the Catholic Church.

== Sources ==
- Kempf, Constantine; Breymann, Francis (1916). "The Martyrs: Peru—Father Peter Marielux". The Holiness of the Church in the Nineteenth Century. Benziger Brothers. pp. 375–377.
- "A Martyr Priest". The Freeman's Journal. Sydney, New South Wales. 23 May 1912. p. 37.
- "A Martyr Priest". Kilmore Free Press. Kilmore, Victoria. 11 July 1912. p. 1.
- "The Story of Father Marielux. Martyr of Sacramental Seal". The Freeman's Journal. Sydney, New South Wales. 17 December 1925. p. 40.
