= Paso de Los Patos =

Coordinates: 32.36289°S 70.2195°W

The Paso de Los Patos (Passage of the Ducks) is an Andean mountain pass between Argentina and Chile, used by the main column of the Army of the Andes to cross the Andes in early 1817, in order to liberate Chile from Spain. It is located to the interior of the town of Putaendo, to the north of the city of San Felipe, Valparaíso Region, Chile, and framed by the imposing Valle de Los Patos Sur (Southern Valley of Ducks), SW of the Province of San Juan, Argentina. Other names are used for the same pass: the passages of Llaretas, Ortiz, the Honda and the Valle Hermoso.
