= Apostolic Vicariate of Yurimaguas =

Apostolic vicariate in Peru

Coordinates: 5°52′S 76°2′W

Apostolic Vicariate of Yurimaguas Apostolicus Vicariatus Yurimaguaënsis
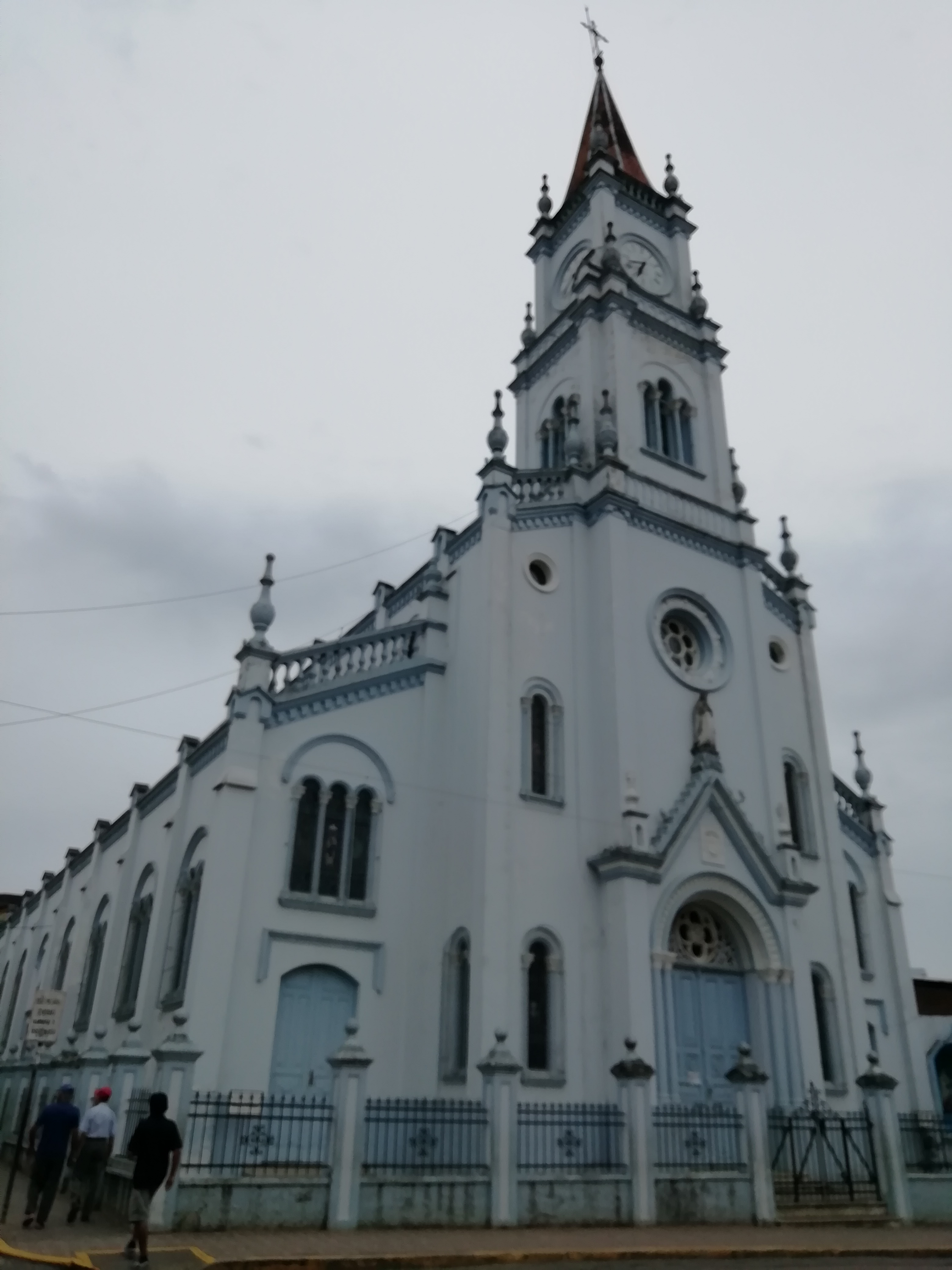
- Cathedral of Our Lady of the Snows

Location
- Country: Peru

Statistics
- Area: 70,000 km^{2} (27,000 sq mi)
- Population: Total; Catholics: (as of 2010); 252,000; 216,000 (85.7%)
- Parishes: 23

Information
- Denomination: Catholic Church
- Sui iuris church: Latin Church
- Rite: Roman Rite
- Established: 27 February 1921 (105 years ago)
- Cathedral: Catedral Virgen de la Nieves

Current leadership
- Pope: Leo XIV
- Vicar Apostolic elect: Jesús María Aristín Seco, C.P.

The Vicariate Apostolic of Yurimaguas (Latin: Apostolicus Vicariatus Yurimaguaënsis) is a Latin Church ecclesiastical territory or apostolic vicariate of the Catholic Church is located in the episcopal see of Yurimaguas in Peru.

== History ==
On 27 February 1921 Pope Benedict XV established the Prefecture Apostolic of San Gabriel de la Dolorosa del Marañón from the Vicariate Apostolic of San León del Amazonas. The prefecture was elevated to a Vicariate Apostolic by Pope Pius XI on 3 June 1936. It lost territory in 1946 when the Prefecture Apostolic of San Francisco Javier was established. The vicariate's name was changed to the Vicariate Apostolic of Yurimaguas on 10 November 1960.

== Bishops ==
=== Ordinaries ===
- Atanasio Celestino Jáuregui y Goiri, C.P. † (1921 – 30 August 1957)
- Gregorio Elias Olazar Muruaga, C.P. † (31 August 1957 – 25 March 1972)
- Miguel Irízar Campos, C.P. † (25 March 1972 – 6 August 1989) Appointed, Coadjutor Bishop of Callao
- José Luis Astigarraga Lizarralde, C.P. (26 November 1991 – 20 January 2017)
- Jesús María Aristín Seco, C.P. (8 July 2020 - present)

=== Coadjutor Vicar Apostolic ===
- Gregorio Elias Olazar Muruaga, C.P. (1952-1957)

== See also ==
- Roman Catholicism in Peru
