= USS Callao =

Three ships of the United States Navy have been named Callao.

- USS Callao (YFB-11), was a Spanish gunboat captured in Manila Bay 12 May 1898 and put into service with the Navy. She was commissioned and decommissioned several times until sold at Manila 13 September 1923.
- USS Callao (ID-4036), was the German liner Sierra Cordoba built in 1913 by AG Vulcan Stettin, seized by Peru and renamed Callao, chartered to the United States Shipping Board and transferred to the Navy 26 April 1919, decommissioned at Norfolk 20 September 1919 and sold by USSB at auction to Dollar Steamship and renamed Ruth Alexander.
- USS Callao (IX-205), was built in 1943–1944 as Externsteine for the German Navy. She was captured, and commissioned into the Navy 24 January 1945. She was decommissioned 10 May 1950, and sold 30 September 1950.
