= Army of the Andes =

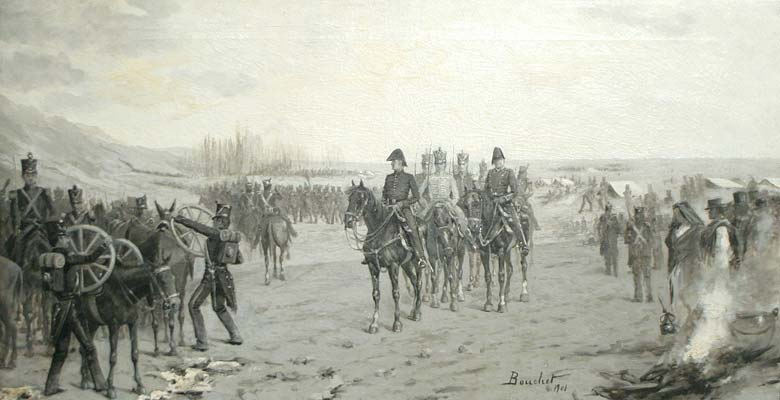
- The Army of the Andes leaving the Plumerillo camp, Museo Histórico Nacional, Buenos Aires.
- Active: 1816–1824
- Allegiance: United Provinces of the Río de la Plata
- Type: Army
- Engagements: Spanish American wars of independence

Commanders
- Supreme commander: José de San Martín
- General commander: Bernardo O'Higgins

Insignia
- Identification symbol
- Identification symbol: Flag of the Andes

The Army of the Andes (Spanish: Ejército de los Andes) was a military force created by the United Provinces of the Río de la Plata (Argentina) and assembled by General José de San Martín as part of his campaign to liberate Chile from the Spanish Empire. In 1817, it crossed the Andes Mountains from the Argentine province of Cuyo (with its staging point being the present-day province of Mendoza, Argentina) and succeeded in its objective by driving the Spanish out of Chile.

The exact number of soldiers in the army varies among sources, with estimates ranging from as low as 3,500 to as high as 6,000 men. The army was composed of Argentines and Chileans, and included approximately 1,200 auxiliaries who assisted with provisioning and supply, along with a complement of artillery. The Congress of Tucumán endorsed San Martín's proposal to form an army to fight the royalists in Chile, and between August 1814 and February 1817, San Martín trained his troops in preparation for their mission. Although the army was less experienced, San Martín aimed to lead a properly disciplined and equipped force into battle, not a mere "motley crew."

For the crossing of the Andes, the army was divided into two main columns. The first, commanded by Captain General José de San Martín and supported by Brigadier Major Miguel Estanislao Soler and Brigadier Bernardo O'Higgins, took the Los Patos Pass. The second, commanded by Colonel Juan Gregorio de las Heras, took the Uspallata Pass, which at its highest point reaches about twelve thousand feet above sea level. Since the Uspallata Pass was more negotiable, the artillery was taken with the second column.

These two divisions formed the main body of the army, but smaller detachments were sent to the north and south as flanking forces. The smaller northern division consisted of about 130 infantrymen and a group of Chilean expatriates under the command of Juan Manuel Cabot. To the south, a group was led by the Chilean Ramón Freire Serrano.

After a 25-day journey across the Andes, the Army of the Andes successfully confronted royalist forces in the Battle of Chacabuco. Following the victory, they entered Santiago de Chile, where San Martín was unanimously elected Supreme Director. However, in accordance with his own resolve and instructions from Buenos Aires, he declined the position. After his refusal, O'Higgins was elected Supreme Director. Under Argentine officers, the Chilean army was reconstituted, and San Martín was appointed commander of the "United Army," a force that combined the Army of the Andes with Chilean troops. This newly formed army fought against the counterattacks of the royalist Army of Osorio at the Battles of Cancha Rayada and Maipú.

== Composition of the Army of the Andes ==
=== Black soldiers ===
The number of black soldiers in the army of San Martin was numerous and comprised the majority of the 7th, 8th and 11th Infantry Regiments. According to San Martin's military doctrine, colored soldiers would serve better in the infantry branch, among the three arms of the Army of the Andes. Blacks represented two thirds of the soldiers in the Army of the Andes. They were estimated at between 2,000 and 3,000 Argentine freedmen who crossed the Andes to Chile in 1817 with San Martin's force. Black troops were mainly recruited from freed former slaves, which Lynch estimates at a figure of 1,554 freedmen. Most of them were recruited in the interior provinces rather than the city of Buenos Aires. Of those 2,500 black soldiers who took part in the Crossing of the Andes, only 143 survived and made it back to Argentina.

In all of these regiments, commissioned officers should have been of Spanish heritage under the laws of the time. But San Martin sought to change the rules so that at least the black soldiers were promoted to corporals and sergeants. Traditionally, the Spanish colonial army battalions were divided into castes of black slaves and free blacks, but San Martin was against segregation and believed in unifying people of color and whites, fighting as soldiers in the same unit. Later both regiments 7th and 8th would be unified in Peru as the black regiment of the Río de la Plata. The 4th Infantry Battalion would also later be converted into an all-black unit.

=== Units (1814–1815) ===
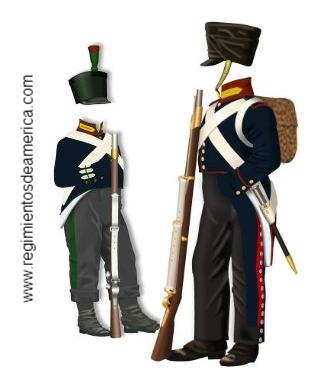
7º Regiment

Argentine Units

- Horse Grenadiers Regiment
- Cavalry Militia Regiment
- San Juan Militias Regiment
- Mendoza Militias Brigade
- La Rioja Militias Brigade
- Commander in Chief's Own Mounted Rifles Escorts Squadron
- San Luis Volunteer Cavalry Regiment
- Mendoza Volunteer Cavalry Regiment
- Mendoza Volunteer Artillery Batteries

Chilean Units

- 1st Chilean Infantry Regiment
- Emigrant Battalion of Chilean Line Infantry
- Southern Patriotic Legion of Dragoons
- Chilean Battalion of Artillery

Combined Argentine–Chilean units

- Argentine Auxiliary Battalion

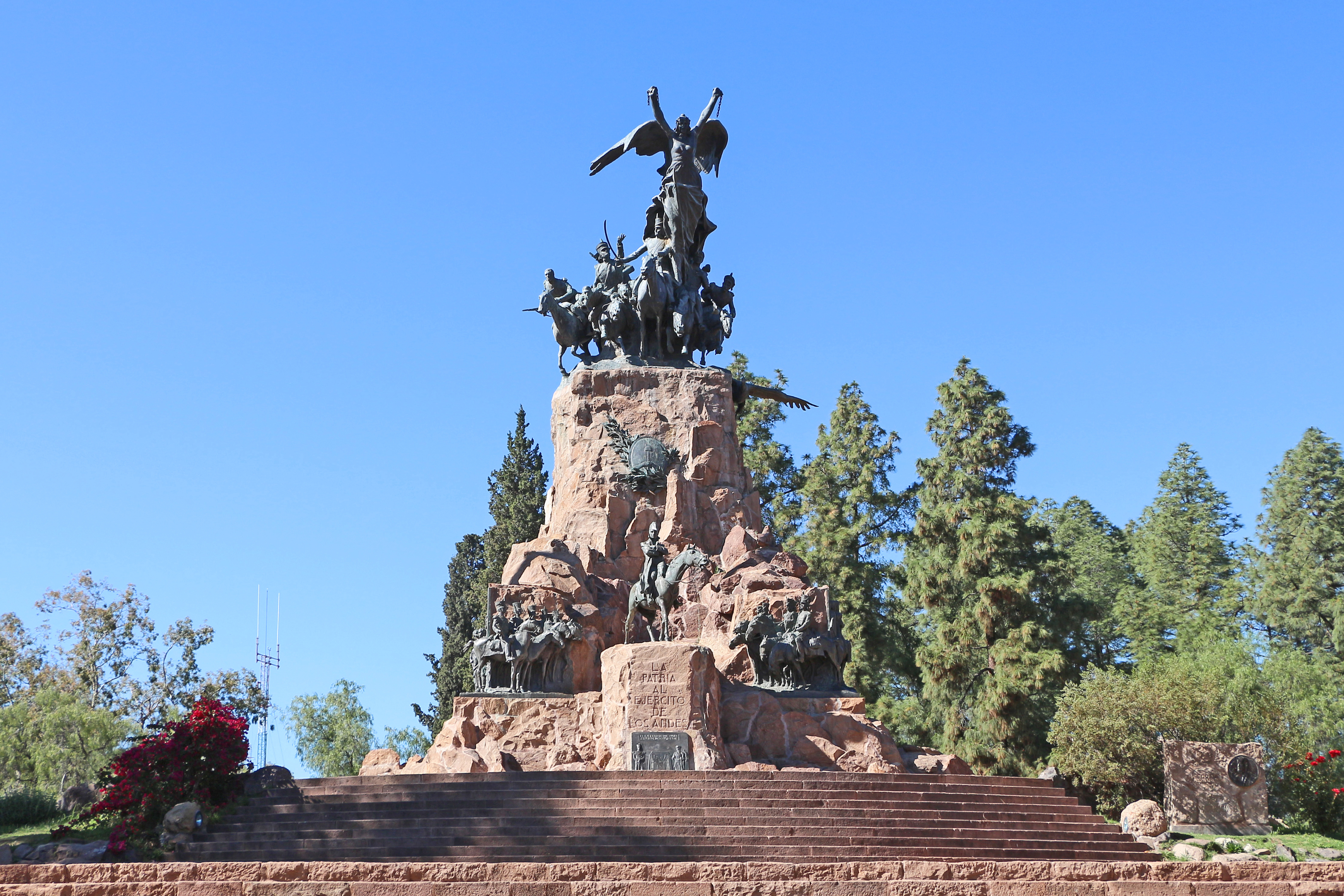
Army of the Andes Monument in Mendoza

=== Units (1815–1817) ===
- 3rd Battalion, Fatherland Regiment of Artillery
- 8th Infantry Battalion
- 11th Infantry Battalion
- 1st Battalion, Andes Rangers and Sharpshooters
- 7th Infantry Battalion
- 4th Infantry Battalion
- Horse Grenadier Regiment
- Commander in Chief's Own Mounted Rifles Escort Squadron
- Río de la Plata Black Regiment (raised 1816)

== See also ==
- Battle of Chacabuco
- Battle of Maipú
- Chilean Independence
- Crossing of the Andes
