= Battle of Callao (1838) =

Battle of the War of the Confederation

- Part of the War of the Confederation
| Date | 24 November 1838 |
| Location | Callao, Peru |
| Result | See aftermath |

Belligerents
| Chile | Peru–Bolivian Confederation |

Commanders and leaders
| Santiago J. Bynnon | Jean Blanchet; San Julián |

Strength
| 2 schooners 1 brig | 1 corvette 1 schooner 3 gunboats |

Casualties and losses
| Unknown | Unknown |

The Battle of Callao was a confrontation during the War of the Confederation, between the Chilean blockade of Callao under the command of Commander Bynnon and the Confederate privateer fleet under Jean Blanchet.

== Background ==
The army of General Manuel Bulnes could not defeat the troops of General Luis José de Orbegoso who were entrenched in the Real Felipe Fortress. In addition the army suffered from epidemics and lack of acclimatization and the Confederate Army commanded by the protector Andrés de Santa Cruz was approaching in a threatening manner, so Bulnes made the determination to leave the Siege of Callao and leave Lima to continue the operations in the north.

Santa Cruz, after seeing the capital abandoned, occupied it. During his stay in Lima, his first step was the reorganization of the naval power to counteract the material superiority of the Chilean Navy, obtained after the naval actions of Admiral García del Postigo in Callao, the protector Andrés de Santa Cruz thought to obtain the help of foreign sailors and merchant ships under the Callao to which he granted red-letter and armed to operate against the Chilean squadron that blocked the port and, unhindered, freely transported the forces of the united restoration army under the command of General Manuel Bulnes. The first of these ships were merchants Shanrock and Edmond who were placed under the command of Juan Blanchet, helmsman of the last ship. Subsequently, the Mexican boat and the schooner Peru would join this squadron.

== The battle ==
On 24 November 1838, the corvette Edmond and the schooner Shanrock sent by Blanchet and supported by three gunboats under the command of the Peruvian corvette captain San Julian held a battle with the Chilean blockade squadron of Callao commanded by the commander Santiago Jorge Bynnon and made up of the schooners Colo-Colo and Janequeo and the brig Achilles.

Major Bynnon who had been in charge of blocking the port by order of Admiral Del Postigo suffered from several weeks of problems to maintain the blockade due to lack of provisions and the fatigue of his men, the ships were in poor condition and need to be repaired.

Bynnon was informed by his lookouts of the offensive preparations that were made in the port of Callao, so he had enough time to order his ships to make themselves out to sea. It was his intention to separate the Edmond corvette and the Shanrock schooner from the smaller vessels commanded by San Julián, which he considered to be of greater danger in the face of being approached by them. The schooner Colo-Colo that went to the rear, opened the fire that was answered by the Shanrock. Shortly after the Achilles also broke the fire, without stopping so far from the port. The combat was limited to the use of the collis by the Chileans and the forward guns by the Confederate fleet.

Finally of a short exchange of bullets against the retreating blocking force, Blanchet's ships turned back to the Callao anchorage. The Chilean ships also turned to follow their enemy until they approached the head of the island of San Lorenzo, where they remained for the rest of the day without the Confederate naval forces trying again to leave the shelter of the port.

== Blockade of Callao is lifted ==
Bynnon, who the day before the battle had already requested reinforcements from the commander of his squadron, declaring that he did not believe in the ability to repel an enemy attack with the forces under his command and that the schooners Janequeo and Colo Colo after a long campaign and constant services at sea, but above all the scarcity of their crews, which made, in the opinion of the commander, very dangerous and otherwise ineffective to maintain the blockade of the port, resolved, according to the respective commanders, suspend the blockade and go to the port of Barranca, where Admiral García del Postigo was, to equip there the schooners and the brig Achilles, whose board were also felt some deficiencies.

This decision, which in the opinion of some Chilean historians was the result of "an erroneous assessment of the situation," was not liked by Admiral García del Postigo, who immediately dispatched him back to Bynon to Callao because he foresaw the dire consequences that the unused lifting of the blockade of Callao could have for the frigate "Valparaiso", who ignorant of the situation went as reinforcement to Callao where he hoped to meet with the blockade fleet, and Chilean transports that at that time sailed without any protection leading troops and supplies to the restoring army along the Peruvian coast.

== Consequences ==
The lifting of the blockade of Callao had as an immediate consequence that Blanchet's squadron went offshore achieving the Capture of "Arequipeño" that allowed Blanchet to increase the morale of his men and increase their material capacity with a new ship, excited about this success other foreign sailors placed themselves under his orders. Then the Confederate squadron captured in Samanco two transports of the Chilean navy that sailed around the place, the frigate Saldivar and the San Antonio brigantine. The strategic error of Commander Bynon forced the Chilean fleet to lift the blockade of the Confederate ports to direct their efforts to protect their transport and lines of communications.
