= José Ramón Rodil, 1st Marquis of Rodil =

Spanish politician and military leader

The Most Excellent The Marquis of Rodil
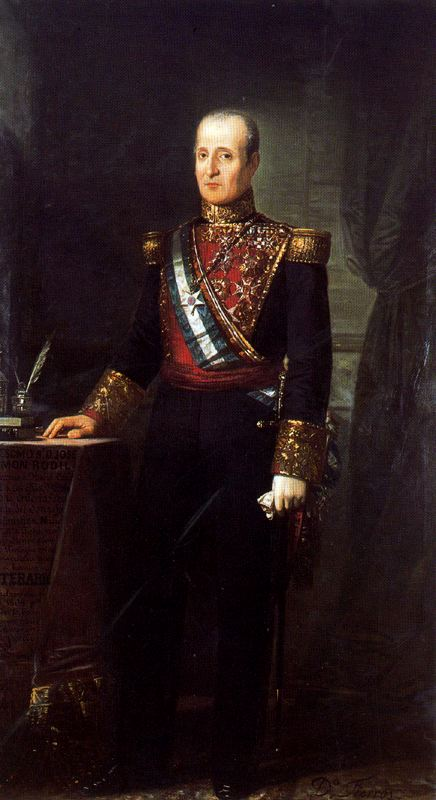

Prime Minister of Spain
- In office June 17, 1842 – May 9, 1843
- Monarch: Isabella II of Spain
- Preceded by: Antonio González y González
- Succeeded by: Joaquín María López

Minister of War of Spain
- In office April 27, 1836 – May 15, 1836
- Preceded by: Ildefonso Díez de Rivera
- Succeeded by: Antonio Seoane
- In office August 20, 1836 – November 26, 1836
- Preceded by: Andrés García Camba
- Succeeded by: Javier Rodríguez
- In office June 17, 1842 – May 9, 1843
- Preceded by: Evaristo Fernández de San Miguel
- Succeeded by: Francisco Serrano

Personal details
- Born: February 5, 1789 Santa María de Trovo, Spain
- Died: February 20, 1853 (aged 64) Madrid, Spain
- Party: Progressive Party
- Education: Mondoñedo Seminary; University of Santiago de Compostela

Military service
- Allegiance: Spain
- Rank: Captain general
- Unit: Literary Battalion
- Battles/wars: Spanish War of Independence Spanish American wars of independence: Chilean War of Independence; Battle of Maipú; Peruvian War of Independence; Siege of Callao (surrendered); First Carlist War

Don José Ramón Rodil y Campillo, 1st Marquis of Rodil and 3rd Viscount of Trobo (February 5, 1789 in Santa María de Trobo, – February 20, 1853 in Madrid) was a Spanish Liberal general and statesman. Originally a law student at the University of Santiago de Compostela, he enlisted in the Spanish army and went to Peru in 1817 as one of the commissioned officers in the fight against the pro-independence nationalist forces. He also served as Prime Minister of Spain from 17 June 1842 to 9 May 1843.

He led the Carabineros Corps, established by a royal decree issued by King Fernando VII in 1829 at the time that Luis López Ballesteros was Minister of Finance.

== Early life ==
Rodil was born on 5 February 1789 in Santa María de Trobo, near Lugo in Galicia. His early studies were at the Mondoñedo Seminary, later studying at the University of Santiago de Compostela. Following the outbreak of the Peninsular War however, he enlisted in the Literary Battalion. In October 1816, he was sent to South America to fight against the "insurrectionists", where he served under Viceroy Joaquín de la Pezuela who ordered him Military Governor of Huamanga and then Lima.

== Last Stand in Callao ==
In 1824, Rodil assumed command of the last Spanish stronghold on Peruvian territory in the port of Callao. Shortly after the last evacuation of Lima by the Royalist Army troops, the pro-independence soldiers finally took the capital, with Bolívar's arrival causing a massive exodus to Callao of those who maintained their loyalty to the Spanish crown, either by sincere conviction, for the defense of their interests, or for subsequent lawsuits with the leaders of the young independent Peru, with various Spaniards, Creoles, and mestizos fleeing as refugees. Now besieged by nationalist forces backed by Simón Bolívar, Rodil refused to surrender, even as scurvy and starvation wreaked havoc among the hundreds of loyalists living in the fort. Even his top lieutenants began turning against him, only for Rodil to execute them by firing squad. He even executed his chaplain, Pedro Marieluz, for not revealing to him the details of the confessions made by those sentenced to death.

Callao was soon populated by more than 8,000 refugees, half of them royalist fighters led by Rodil. Despite being informed in January 1825 about the capitulation at Ayacucho and its terms, the Spanish chief rejected the surrender proposal and insisted on defending Callao, hoping at some point to receive military reinforcements from Spain that never arrived.

The Patriots, despairing at the resistance of the Spaniards, threatened reprisals against the defenders of Callao but were countermanded by Bolívar: "Heroism does not merit punishment. How we would applaud Rodil if he were a patriot!". Nevertheless, in the long run, resistance proved futile; two of Rodil's trusted comrades who commanded other forts nearby, and their forces, jumped to the nationalist side, thus revealing Rodil's potential defensive plans. The siege came to an end with the inability of the besieged to continue, with many of them dying as a result of the conditions in the port, themselves the result of a lack of resources and hygiene. On January 22, 1826, Rodil surrendered to Venezuelan General Bartolomé Salom and was allowed to go back to Spain, which he did, accompanied by a hundred Spanish officers and soldiers who had served under him.

== Return to Spain and later life ==
Back in Spain, Rodil was more respected than his other Army colleagues, such as José de la Serna and José de Canterac, who had been defeated in the earlier Battle of Ayacucho. After Ferdinand VII's death, he supported Isabella II in the civil war against the Carlists. He later was viceroy of Navarra, which had not been fully incorporated in the Spanish Kingdom, and was President of the Government of Spain in 1842. He had a personal rivalry with Baldomero Espartero, Count of Luchana, who had attempted to divest him of his military honors. Rodil then retired from Spanish politics, and died at age 64 on February 19, 1853.

Political offices
Preceded by Antonio González y González	Prime Minister of Spain; 1842–1843	Succeeded by Joaquín María López
