= St. Joseph's Cathedral, Callao =

Coordinates: 12.0598°S 77.1464°W

St. Joseph's Cathedral
- Catedral de San José
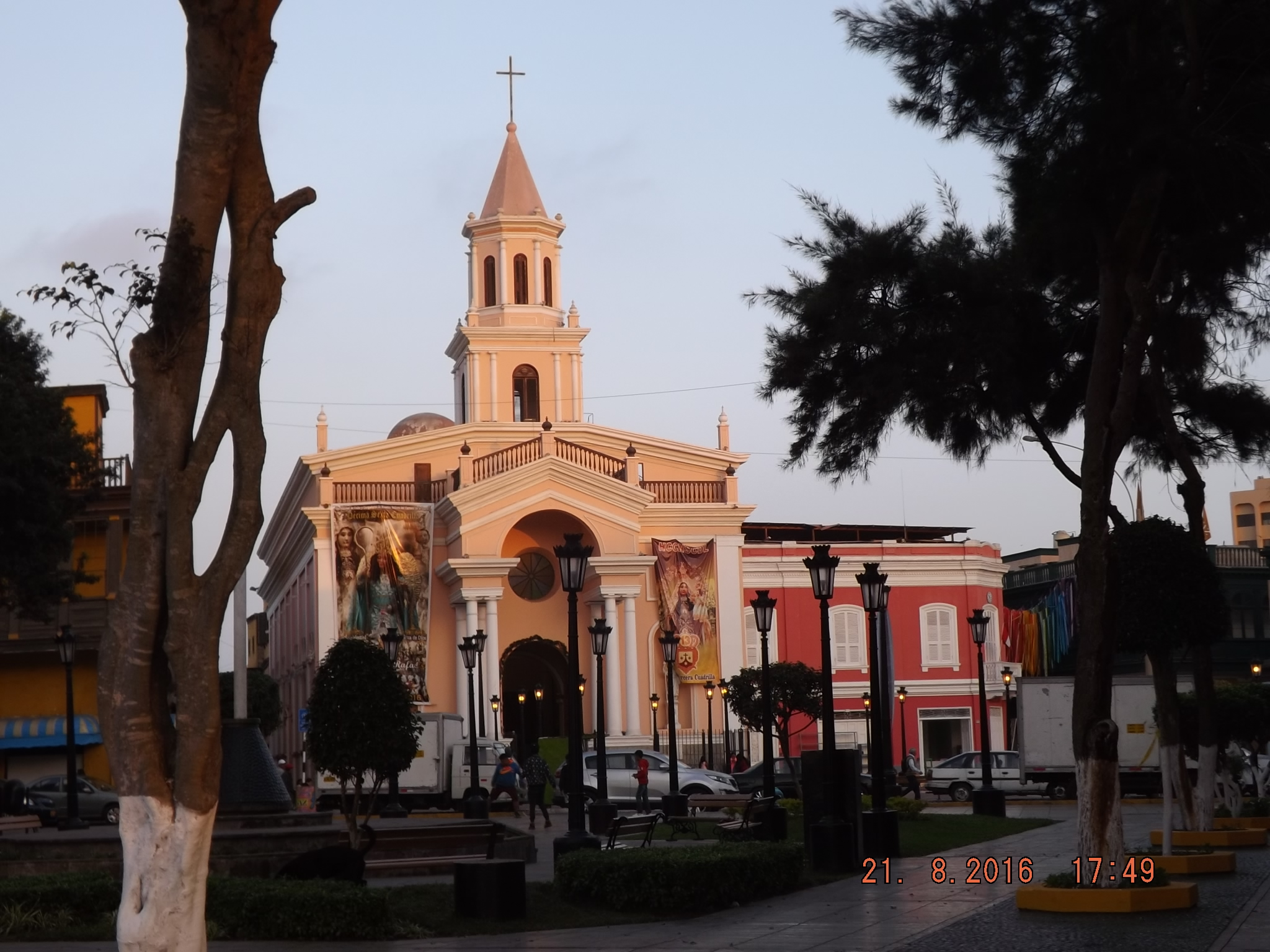
- St. Joseph's Cathedral
- Location: Callao
- Country: Peru
- Denomination: Roman Catholic Church

Architecture
- Architectural type: church

The St. Joseph's Cathedral (Spanish: Catedral de San José) also called Callao Cathedral or Callao's Main Church is a religious building in the historic centre of Callao part of the constitutional province of Callao part of the South American country of Peru. It is a property of the Catholic Church. The building is neoclassical in style. The construction was completed in 1893 with the design of Antonio Dañino. It was remodeled after an earthquake in 1970. On September 16, 1995, it was officially consecrated as Callao Cathedral.

It is the mother church or main church of the Diocese of Callao (Diocese Callaënsis) that was created in 1967 by Pope Paul VI through the bull Aptiorem Ecclesiarum.

It is under the pastoral responsibility of Bishop José Luis Del Palacio and Pérez-Medel.

== See also ==
- Roman Catholicism in Peru
- St. Joseph's Cathedral

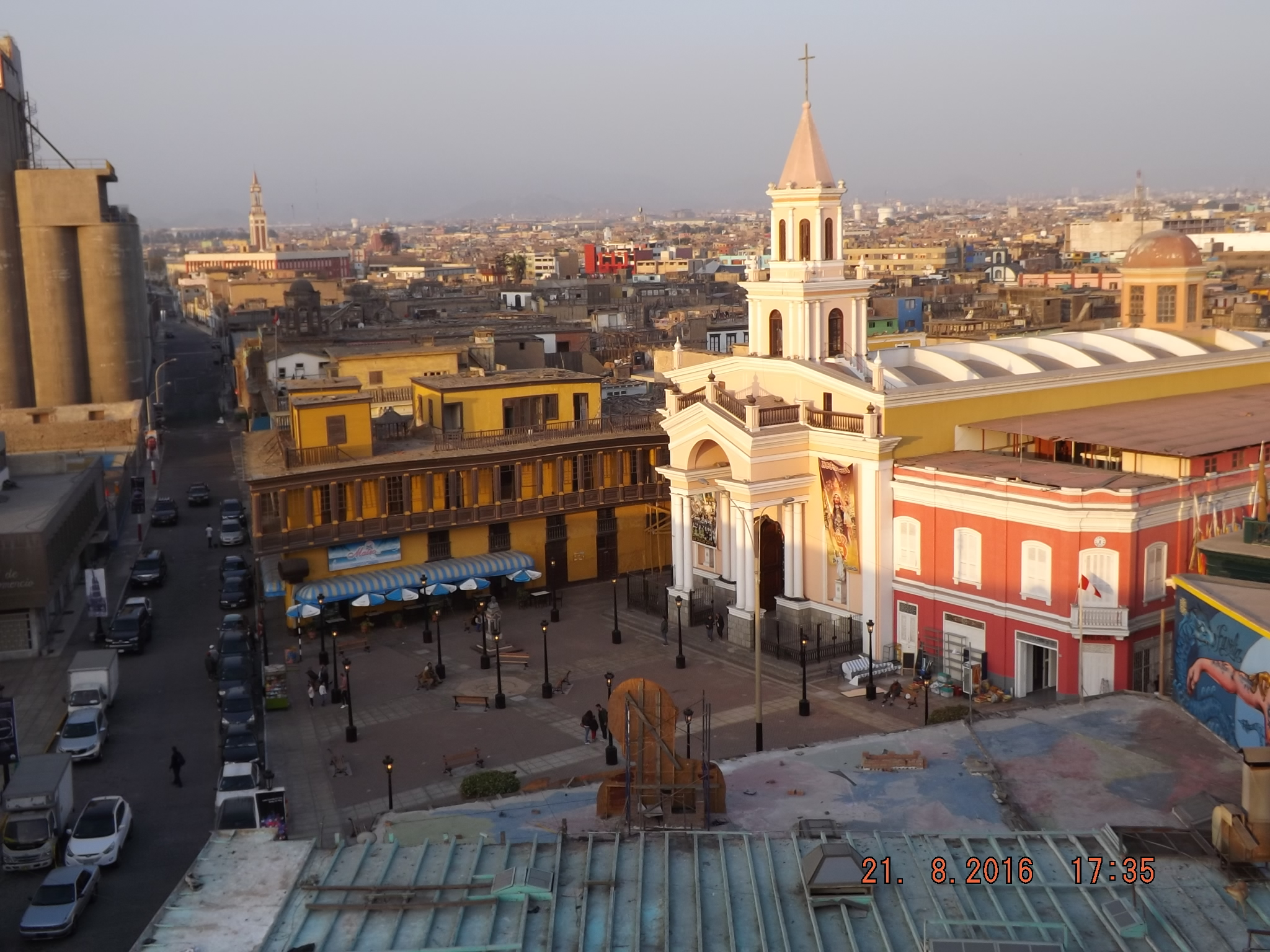
Another view
