= Literary Battalion =

Military company

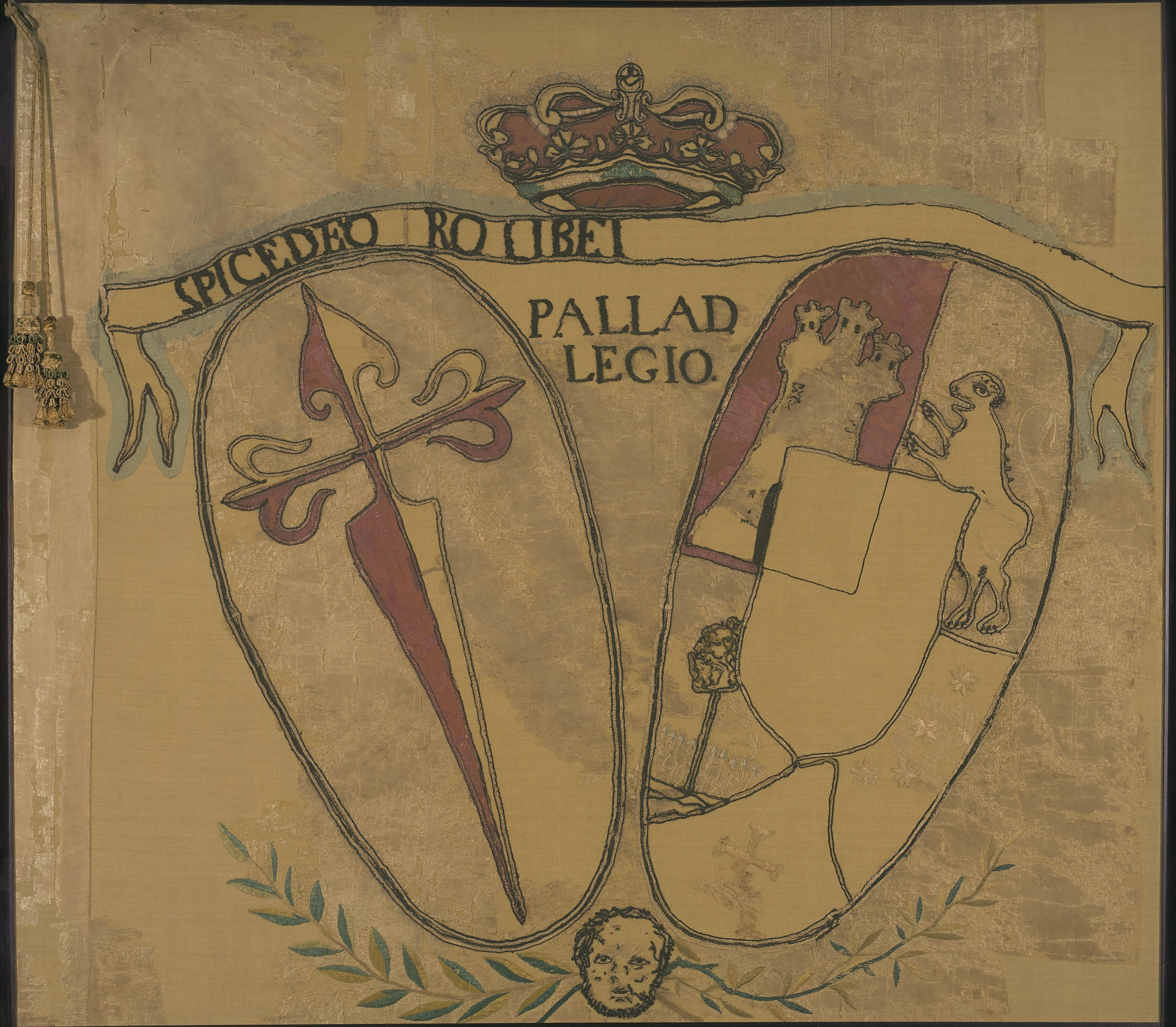
Literary Battalion

The Literary Battalion was a military company composed of students from the University of Santiago de Compostela in Spain. Although there were a number of different incarnations of the group, the most notable fought in the Spanish War of Independence (1808–1814).

== History ==
The Literary Battalion was first formed in 1663, in the face of the Portuguese attacks on the town of Monterrey, after the revolt of Portugal against Spain in 1640. It formed again in 1665, 1808 and in 1846 (during the Solís Uprising). However, the 1808 unit is by far the most famous.

=== 1808 campaign ===
The unit was formed in 42 days, after a meeting held in the cloisters of the university presided over by Rafael Múzquiz, Archbishop of Compostela. In 1808, Juan Ignacio de Armada Caamaño Ibáñez de Mondragón y Salgado de Sotomayor (Marquis of Santa Cruz de Rivadulla) agreed to lead the unit and provide financial support. According to Alfonso Armada Comyn, the marquis at the time, "In order to be able to lead the university students he was made a doctor in all the faculties".

The unit's colours (which are today preserved in the Assembly Hall of the Faculty of Law of the university) were the blue and white of the Flag of Galicia and carried two shields: the Cross of Saint James and the coat of arms of the University of Santiago de Compostela. This was surmounted by a royal crown and an inscription. The soldiers also wore a ribbon bearing a brief poem: "To rescue Fernando (King Fernando VII) and to put an end to Bonaparte Minerva and Mars are united."

On 18 July 1808 the battalion left to join the troops of General Joaquín Blake, where the Navarrese volunteers were joined by the vanguard. Among the multiple recorded exploits was that of entering incognito the city of A Coruña, taken by French Marshal Michel Ney, to reconnoitre the batteries.

In 1810 General Francisco Javier Castaños ordered the disbandment of the Literary Battalion, promoting the few survivors to the rank of officer in the military corps.

=== Remembrance ===
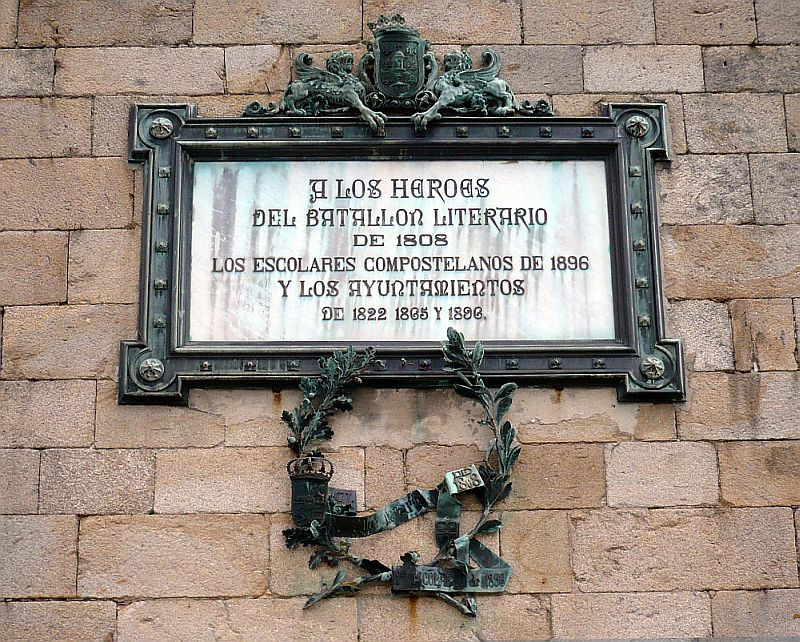
The plaque in Quintana Plaza

A commemorative plaque in Quintana Plaza in the city of Santiago de Compostela bears the inscription:

A LOS HEROES DEL BATALLON LITERARIO DE 1808
LOS ESCOLARES COMPOSTELANOS DE 1896 Y LOS AYUNTAMIENTOS DE 1822 1865 Y 1896

(To the heroes of the Literary Battalion of 1808
The Compostela scholars of 1896 and the city councils of 1822 1865 and 1896)

== Bibliography ==
- Tettamancy Gastón, Francisco [in Spanish] (1911). Galos y Britanos, Batallón Literario de Santiago [Gauls and Britons, Literary Battalion of Santiago] (in Spanish). Impr. y fotograbado de Ferrer.
- Barreiro Fernández, Xosé Ramón (2003). Historia de la Universidad de Santiago de Compostela. Siglo XIX (in Spanish). Vol. 2. Santiago: Universidade de Santiago de Compostela. ISBN 84-9750-269-8.
- Tettamancy Gastón, Francisco [in Spanish] (1910). Batallón Literario de Santiago: Diario de campaña (años 1808 al 1812). A Coruña: Imprenta y Fotograbado de Ferrer.
