= Miguel Irízar Campos =

Spanish-born Peruvian Roman Catholic bishop (1934–2018)

Miguel Irízar Campos C.P.
- Bishop of Callao
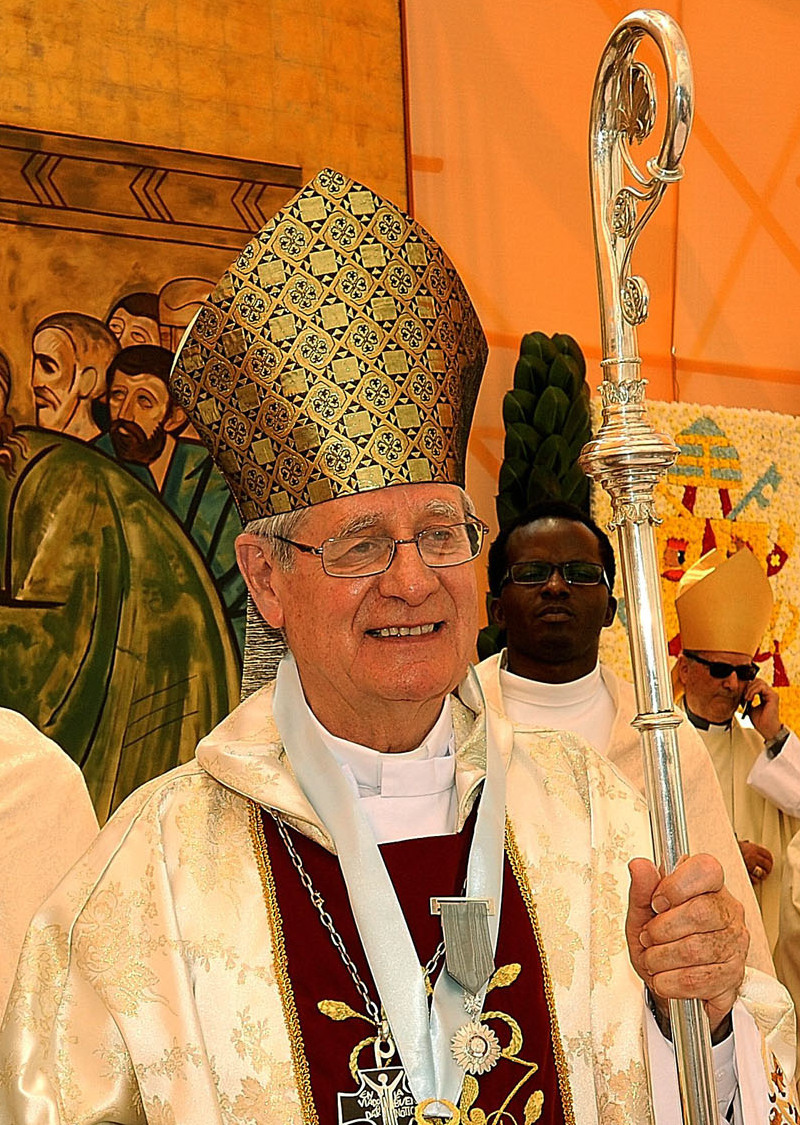
- Native name: Miguel Irizar Campos
- Church: Catholic Church
- Diocese: Diocese of Callao
- In office: 17 August 1995 – 12 December 2011
- Predecessor: Ricardo Durand
- Successor: José Luis del Palacio
- Previous posts: Coadjutor Bishop of Callao (1989-1995); Titular Bishop of Elo (1972-1989); Vicar Apostolic of Yurimaguas (1972-1989)

Orders
- Ordination: 16 March 1957
- Consecration: 25 July 1972 by Agnelo Rossi

Personal details
- Born: 7 May 1934 Ormaiztegi, Gipuzkoa, Spanish Republic
- Died: 19 August 2018 (aged 84) Deusto, Bilbao, Basque Country, Spain

Miguel Irízar Campos C.P. (7 May 1934 – 19 August 2018) was a Spanish-born Peruvian Roman Catholic bishop.

Irízar Campos was born in Ormaiztegi, Spain and was ordained to the priesthood in 1957. He served as bishop of the Apostolic Vicariate of Yurimaguas, Peru, from 1972 to 1989. He then served as coadjutor bishop of the Roman Catholic Diocese of Callao, Peru from 1989 to 1995 and bishop of the diocese from 1995 to 2011. He was also member of former Vatican institution of Pontifical Council Cor Unum.
