= Second siege of Callao =

Siege of the port of Callao from 1824 to 1826 during the Peruvian War of Independence

- Part of the Peruvian War of Independence
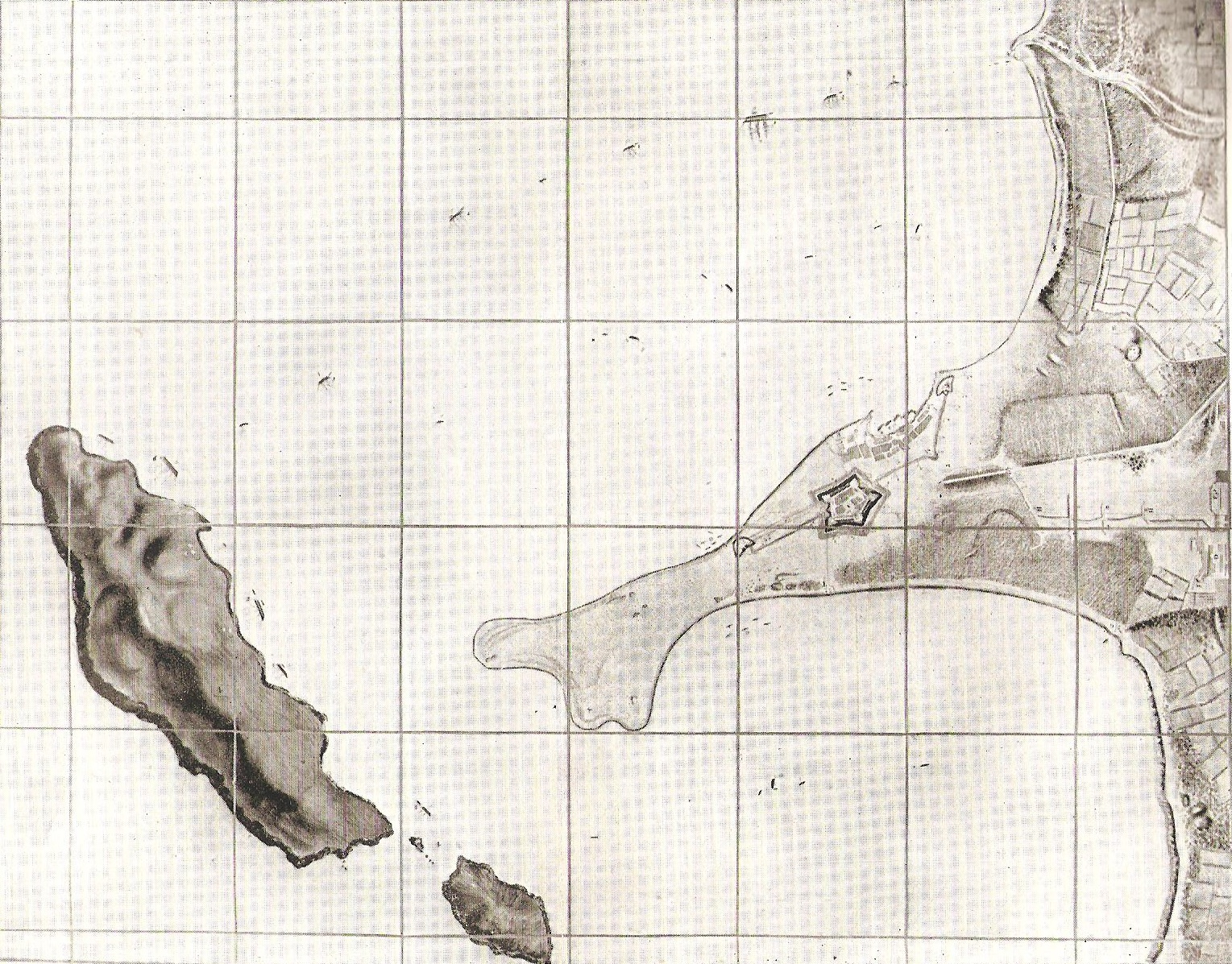
- The port of Callao in 1838
Date	5 December 1824–23 January 1826
Location	Callao, Peru 12°02′00″S 77°08′00″W
Result	Patriot Army victory; End of the Peruvian War of Independence; Last Spanish stronghold in South America collapses; End of the Peruvian Viceroyalty in Peru

Belligerents
Peru; Gran Colombia; Chile	Spain

Commanders and leaders
Land army: (Gran Colombia) Bartolomé Salom; Blockade army: (Peru) Martin Guisse; Manuel Blanco (Gran Colombia) Juan Illingworth	(Spain) José Ramón Rodil (surrendered) (Spain) Isidro Alaix (surrendered); Spanish squadron: (Spain) Roque Guruceta (deserted, using the Capitulation of Ayacucho as a pretext)

Strength
Bolivarian forces: 4,700 soldiers (half of them Colombians); Naval force: 1 schooner brig 2 frigates 2 corvettes 3 brigs 3 gunboats 171 guns 914 crew	Royalist army in Callao: 2,200–2,280 regulares (530 soldiers from the Río de la Plata Regiment); 800–1,000 militiamen Total: 2,000–4,000 sailors, soldiers, militiamen and gunners

Casualties and losses
177 casualties during combat 2,500 casualties outside of the fortress Several dead due to disease	767–785 killed in action 1,312 dead due to disease 14 deserters 80 surrendered
- José Bernardo de Tagle and 8,000 people of Lima who had taken refuge in the fortress, whether asylum seekers or supporters of the Spanish monarchy, died during the siege as victims of famine or disease, 6,000 of them from scurvy.
- Location within Lima Second siege of Callao (Peru) Second siege of Callao (South America)

The second siege of Callao or Fall of Callao (Spanish: Caída del Callao) was the longest lasting siege that occurred on the Pacific coast during the Spanish American wars of independence. The siege was carried out by the combined Gran Colombian and Peruvian independence forces against the royalist soldiers defending the Real Felipe Fortress in the port of Callao, who refused to surrender, and refused to accept the capitulation of the Battle of Ayacucho.

The siege took place from December 5, 1824 to January 23, 1826, when the royalist stronghold was defeated, ending the Spanish Empire's presence in South America.

== Background ==
During the Peruvian War of Independence, in July 1821 Viceroy José de la Serna evacuated Lima with the troops of the Royal Army of Peru who were still under his command and thus the troops led by General José de San Martín occupied the city days later, proclaiming the independence of Peru. As a consequence, on September 21 of the same year, the troops of the Liberating Expedition of Peru also occupied the Real Felipe Fortress, dominating the strategic port of Callao.

When José de San Martín withdrew from Peru in September 1822 after the Guayaquil Conference with Simón Bolívar, he left a garrison of almost 1,500 soldiers in Callao, many of them Argentine veterans of the Army of the Andes, along with companies formed by former slaves recruited in Peru, and artillerymen from Chile. The situation of these troops became precarious in the following months, due to the political struggles between the leaders of independent Peru, due to the adverse results in the military campaign against the Royalist Army, and the serious shortage of food and essential clothing for the troops.

== Callao mutiny ==
On June 18, 1823, Spanish general José de Canterac seized Lima along with numerous royalist soldiers, and remained in the city until July 16. When the independent troops, now led from Trujillo by Bolívar, recovered Lima, 2,000 soldiers from the patriot side remained in Callao. However, the bad conditions in which this garrison was found did not undergo any improvement, and there were several seditious instigations towards the troops of Callao to pass them to the royalist side. Such maneuvers were led by José Bernardo de Tagle, the Marquis of Torre Tagle, a Peruvian independence leader who lost his status as president due to the arrival of Bolívar. As a result, the Callao mutiny broke out on February 5, 1824. Some common soldiers tried to contain the revolt but were quickly reduced and executed.

After the mutiny, most of the independent soldiers garrisoned in Real Felipe changed sides and joined the Royalist Army. Given this, the troops still loyal to the Peruvian government evacuated Lima due to the seriousness of the situation. Royalist forces led by Spanish General Monet entered Lima almost without resistance on February 25, after the withdrawal of the patriotic troops, appointing Brigadier José Ramón Rodil as head of the Callao garrison.

The military campaigns of 1824 were widely favorable to the independent troops that now had reinforcements from Gran Colombia, while the revolt of Pedro Antonio Olañeta in Upper Peru, together with the shortage of supplies and the lack of reinforcements from Spain, increased the difficulties on the royalist side to continue the war. After the triumph of the Liberation Army in the Battle of Junín in August 1824, the situation of the royalists was further affected; At the beginning of December 1824, the royalist soldiers still stationed in Lima withdrew to the mountains, only to abandon the fight shortly after when they learned the result of the Battle of Ayacucho fought on December 9, with the subsequent capitulation of the Viceroy himself.

== Siege ==
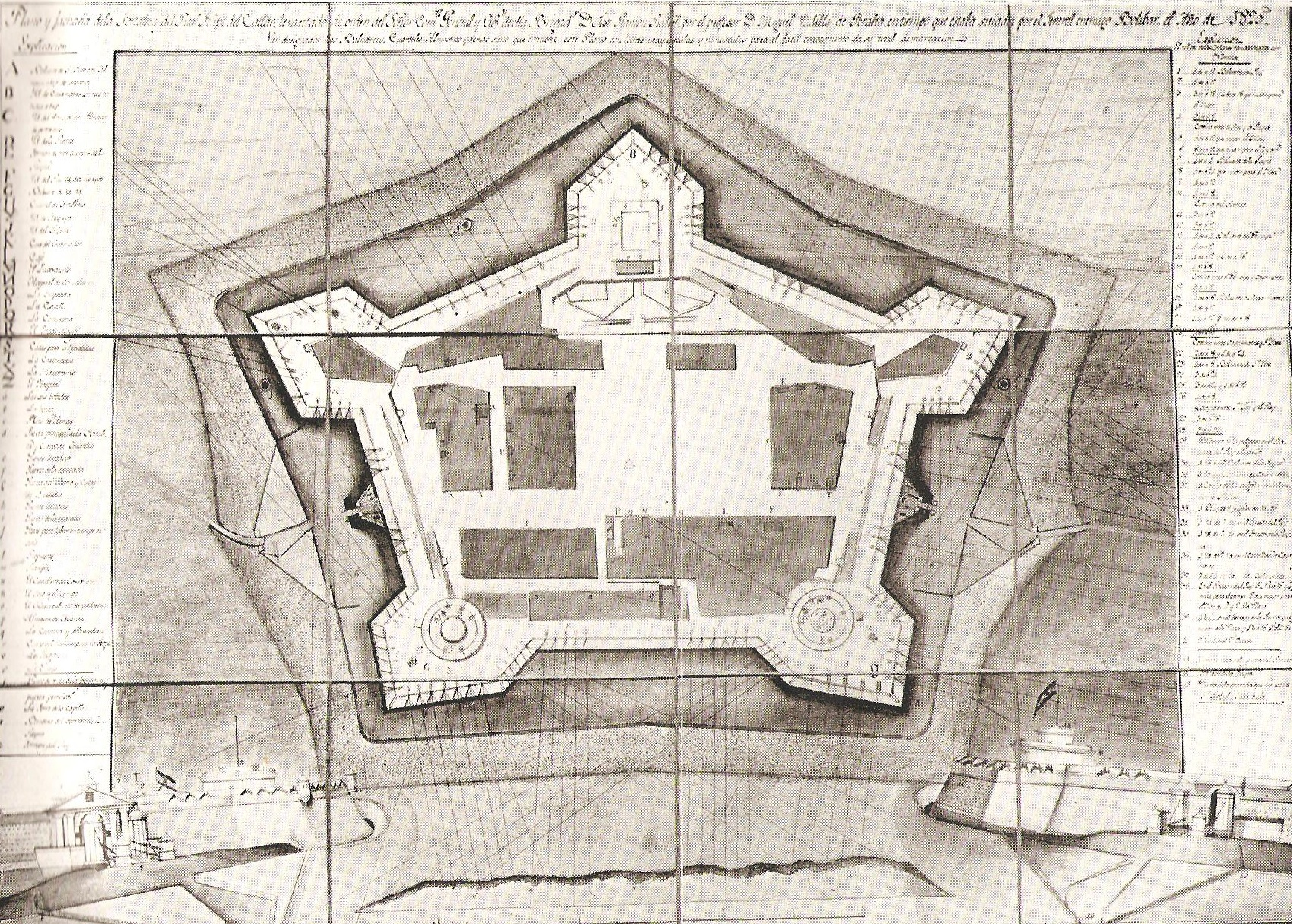
Real Felipe Fortress around the time of the siege.

Shortly after the last evacuation of Lima by the Royalist Army troops, the independent soldiers finally took the capital, with Bolívar's arrival causing a massive exodus to Callao of those who maintained their loyalty to the Spanish crown, either by sincere conviction, for the defense of their interests, or for subsequent lawsuits with the leaders of the young independent Peru, with various Spaniards, Creoles and mestizos fleeing as refugees. Bolívar declared the start of the second siege on December 5, 1824.

Callao was soon populated by more than 8,000 refugees, half of them royalist fighters led by José Ramón Rodil. Despite being informed in January 1825 about the capitulation at Ayacucho and its terms, this Spanish chief rejected the surrender proposal and insisted on defending Callao, hoping at some point to receive military reinforcements from Spain that never arrived.

To break the resistance, the Liberation Army, made up of Colombians and Peruvians for the most part, under the command of Venezuelan General Bartolomé Salom, established its camp in Bellavista and proceeded to surround the fortified area of Callao, bombarding the port constantly for months with heavy artillery fire. From the sea the ships of the independent side, commanded by the Chilean admiral Manuel Blanco Encalada and made up of the combined fleets of Chile, Colombia and Peru also attacked the royalist stronghold with their cannons without pause. The defenders however had an artillery bastion to repel attacks by sea and which had been a key part of Spain's defensive system for its colonies in the Pacific Ocean, while the fortress's walled enclosure also made a frontal assault from land difficult, all of which together to the unbreakable will of its defenders it made a difficult and prolonged siege.

Lack of sufficient supplies and overcrowding in a port that was not prepared to host so many refugees permanently did great harm to the besieged. It was soon realized that food would be scarce in Callao, so from the beginning the refugees established a black market for food at very high prices, first trading with the few vegetables, fruits, and poultry that were available in the port, to then trafficking in unsuitable meat, such as horse meat, finally trading rat meat in the absence of any other available food.

In addition to the bombing by the Liberation Army and general malnutrition, epidemics were rampant, which made resistance more difficult. Severe punishments were imposed on those who tried to riot, with soldiers and civilians who tried to desert or collaborate with the enemy being shot. The diseases were aggravated by the lack of food and the poor sanitary conditions, as well as overcrowding.

Rodil gave the order to expel into the patriotic ranks the penniless civilians whose presence was deemed unnecessary in order to save food for his troops. The troops of the Liberation Army accepted some civilians at first, but noticing the strategy of the royalist leader, they repulsed with rifle fire the subsequent waves of refugees, who were also rejected in the same way by the royalist soldiers if they tried to return to Callao. As a result, many civilians perished from bullets from both sides or from hunger and thirst in the middle of no-man's-land.

The siege came to an end with the inability of the besieged to continue, with many of them dying as a result of the conditions in the port, themselves the result of a lack of resources and hygiene. Among the dead were former president José Bernardo de Tagle (as well as his wife and one of his children), former vicepresident Diego de Aliaga, José de Aliaga, among others.

At the beginning of January 1826, royalist colonel Ponce de León joined the independence ranks, and shortly afterwards royalist commander Riera, governor of the Castle of San Rafael, handed over the fortress. Both events made defense almost impossible, since Ponce de León knew the location of the rudimentary land mines placed to prevent any frontal attack by the patriots, while Riera directed a strategic stronghold whose loss facilitated the entry of patriotic soldiers into the plaza, in addition to fully knowing the defense device formed by Rodil.

== End of the siege ==
Although neither Rodil nor the garrison ever planned a surrender, there was no longer any hope of reinforcements from Spain after more than a year of futile waiting; The garrison itself was feeding on rats in the absence of other available food, and with the ammunition about to run out, so negotiations began with General Salom on January 11, 1826 and concluded with the handover of the fortress on January 23. that same month. The astonishing resistance of the royalist chief deserved that President Santander told Bartolomé Salom after the triumph, when the latter asked to execute Rodil via firing squad: "Heroism does not merit punishment. How we would applaud Rodil if he were a patriot!"

The capitulation allowed the departure with all honors of the last survivors of the Royalist Army (only 400 soldiers of the 2,800 that existed at the beginning). Most of the civilian refugees had already died and many surviving ones also left for Spain. Rodil saved the flags of the Real Infante and Arequipa regiments, the rest remained as war trophies. Shortly after, he embarked for Spain accompanied by a hundred Spanish officers and soldiers who had served under him.

The Peruvian 3ro. de Línea battalion and Dragones de la República regiment both adopted the name Callao in honor of their outstanding participation during the siege. Likewise, the Real Felipe Fortress was again renamed the Independence Fortress, a name given to it by General San Martín in 1821.

== See also ==
- Spanish American Wars of Independence
- Battle of Ayacucho
- Siege of Callao (disambiguation)
