= Diocese of Callao =

Roman Catholic diocese in Peru

Coordinates: 12.0333°S 77.1333°W

Diocese of Callao Dioecesis Callaënsis

Catholic
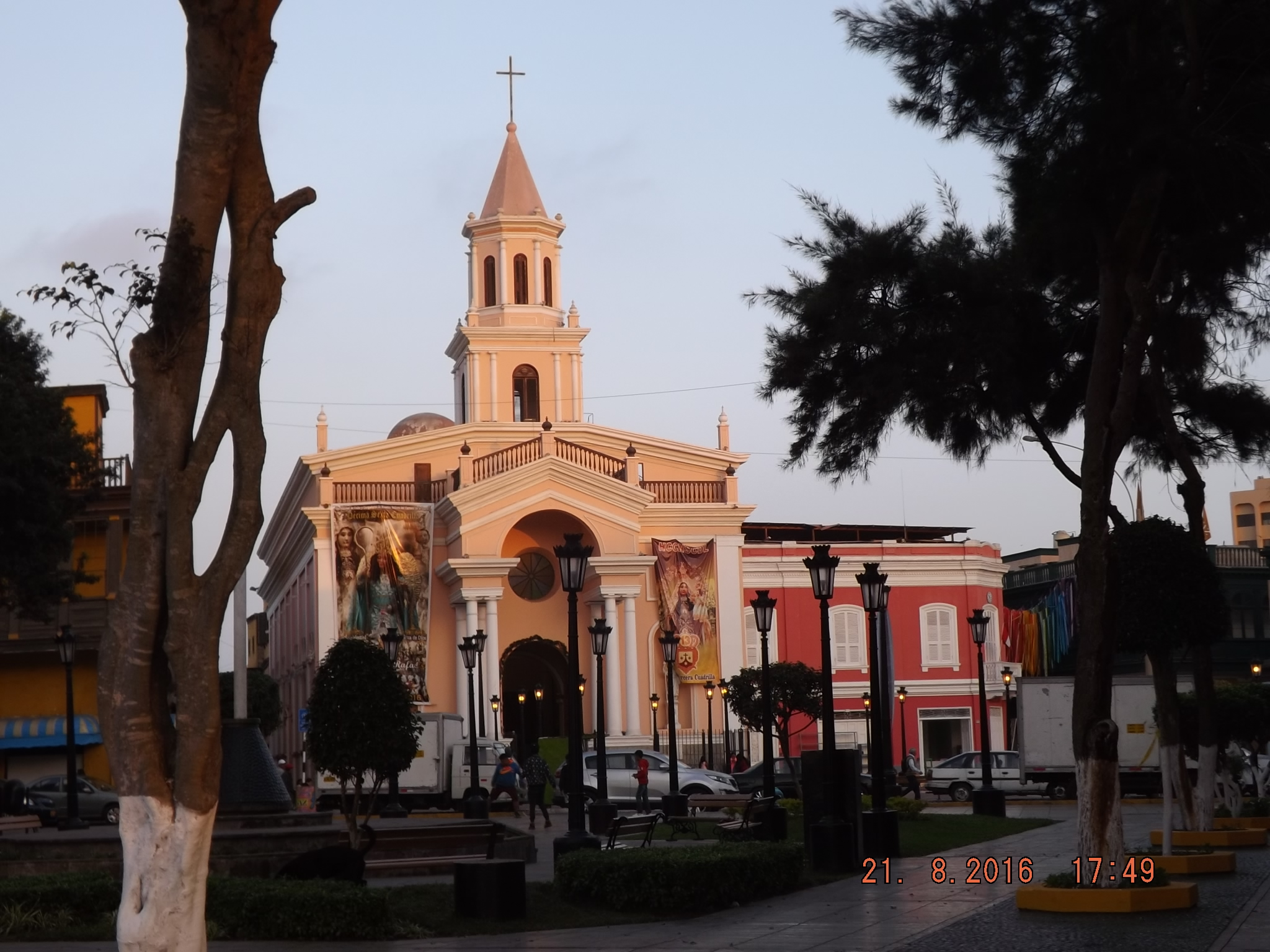
- St. Joseph's Cathedral, Callao

Location
- Country: Peru
- Metropolitan: Lima

Statistics
- Area: 165 km^{2} (64 sq mi)
- Population: Total; Catholics: (as of 2021); 1,573,250; 1,296,670 (82.4%)

Information
- Rite: Latin Rite
- Cathedral: St. Joseph's Cathedral, Callao

Current leadership
- Pope: Leo XIV
- Bishop: Luis Alberto Barrera Pacheco, M.C.C.I
- Auxiliary Bishops: Miguel Ángel Contreras Llajaruna, S.M.
- Bishops emeritus: José Luis Del Palacio y Pérez-Medel

Map

The Roman Catholic Diocese of Callao (Latin: Callaën(sis)) is a diocese located in the city of Callao in the ecclesiastical province of Lima in Peru. It was established on 29 April 1967. From April 2020 to May 2021 it was led as apostolic administrator by Robert Francis Prevost, then Bishop of Chiclayo and later Pope Leo XIV.

== History ==
- 29 April 1967: Established as Diocese of Callao from the Metropolitan Archdiocese of Lima

== Bishops ==
Since its erection on 29 April 1967, the diocese has had six ordinaries, one coadjutor bishop, two auxiliary bishops and an apostolic administrator.

=== Ordinaries ===
- Eduardo Picher Peña (3 August 1967 – 31 May 1971), appointed Archbishop of Huancayo
- Luis Vallejos Santoni (20 September 1971 – 14 January 1975), appointed Archbishop of Cuzco
- Ricardo Durand Flórez, S.J. (14 January 1975 – 17 August 1995), Archbishop (personal title)
- Miguel Irízar Campos, C.P. (17 August 1995 – 12 December 2011)
- José Luis Del Palacio y Pérez-Medel (12 December 2011 – 15 April 2020)
- Apostolic administrator: Robert Francis Prevost, O.S.A., Bishop of Chiclayo (later Pope Leo XIV) (15 April 2020 – 26 May 2021)
- Luis Alberto Barrera Pacheco, M.C.C.J. (17 April 2021 – present)

=== Coadjutor bishop ===
- Miguel Irízar Campos, C.P. (6 August 1989 – 17 August 1995), succeeded as Bishop of Callao

=== Auxiliary bishops ===
- Javier Augusto Del Río Alba (12 October 2004 – 11 July 2006), appointed Coadjutor Archbishop of Arequipa
- Miguel Ángel Contreras Llajaruna, S.M. (15 May 2025 – present)

== See also ==
- Roman Catholicism in Peru

== Sources ==
- GCatholic.org
- Catholic Hierarchy
- Diocese website
