= Real Felipe Fortress =

Real Felipe Fortress National Monument
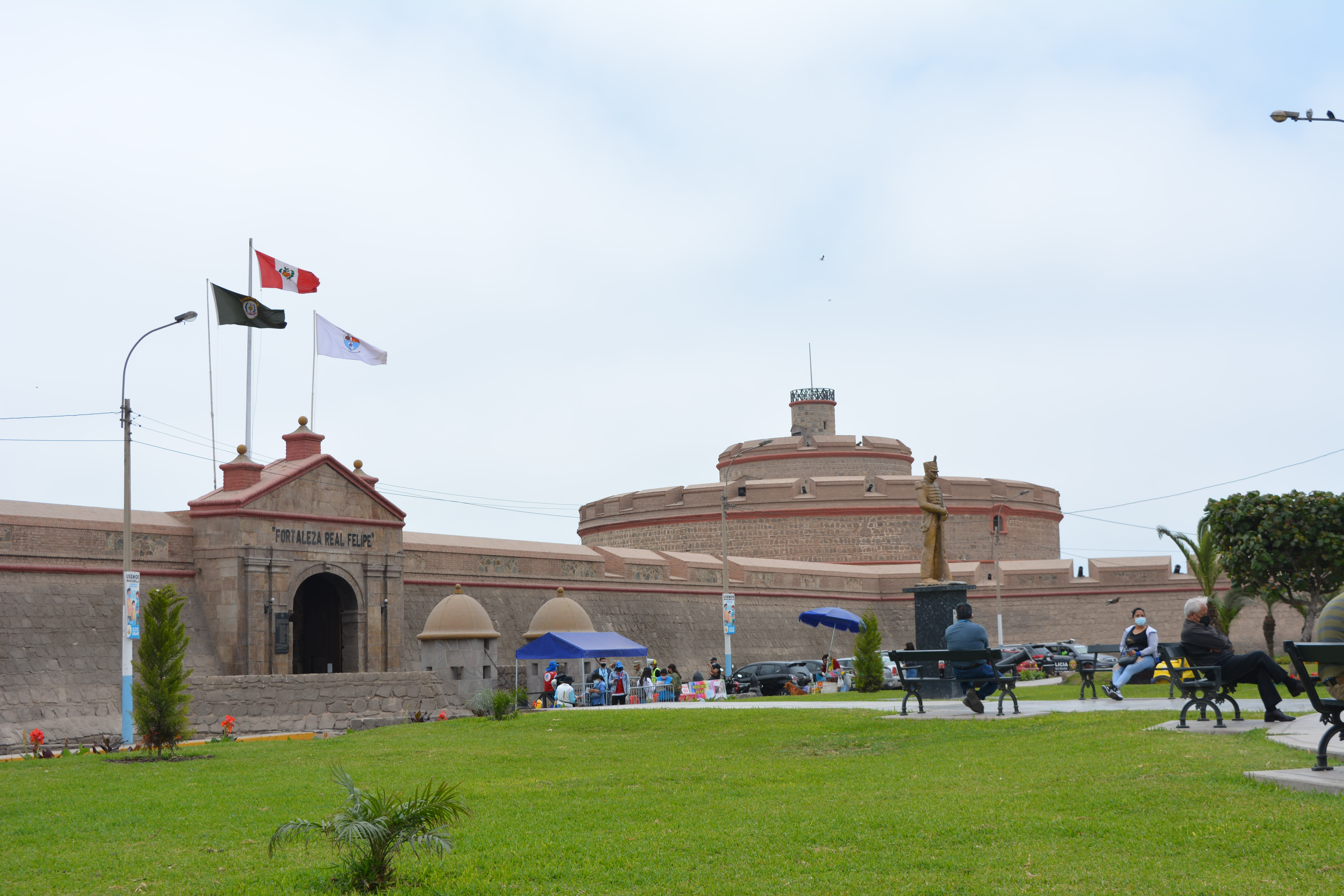
- Frontal view of the Real Felipe Fortress

- Location within Peru
- 12°3′46″S 77°8′57″W
- Location: Callao Bay, Peru

History
- Built: 1747–1774 and 1776–1811

Site notes
- Area: 70,000 m^{2} (750,000 sq ft)
- Governing body: Peru's Army

The Real Felipe Fortress is a fortress located within the Monumental Zone of Callao, Peru. It was built to defend the main port of the country, as well as the city of Lima from pirates and corsairs during colonial times. The fortress was subject to a two-year siege that ended Spain's presence in both Peru and South America. It is currently the Peruvian Army Museum, displaying historical uniforms, weapons and other military paraphernalia.

== History ==
=== Background ===
During the Viceroyalty of Peru, Callao was the main port of the Americas, it connected the colonies with Spain. Due to the lack of adequate defenses, several pirate incursions took place. In an attempt to protect the port, the viceroy Pedro Álvarez de Toledo y Leiva decreed the construction of the Walls of Lima between the years 1640 and 1647 to protect the city. However, the 1746 Lima–Callao earthquake, destroyed most of the fortifications. Viceroy José Antonio Manso de Velasco, ordered the construction of the fortress to bolster the defense of the port.

=== Construction ===
In 1746, the design proposal of French architect Louis Godin was selected as the design of the fortress. Construction of the fortress began on 21 January 1747 and the first stone was erected 1 August of the same year. This was considered one of the most important constructions made by Spain in the New World, costing about three million pesetas. Most of the stone came from San Lorenzo Island and from the ruins caused by the earthquake. The name of the fortress was chosen to honor the Spanish king Felipe V from the House of Bourbon, who had recently died. Construction ended during the reign of viceroy Manuel de Amat y Junient in 1774.

In 1782, viceroy Manuel Guirior decided to bolster the defences of the fortress with the construction of two smaller complementary fortresses; the «San Miguel» and the «San Rafael». This system came to be known as «Los Castillos del Callao» (The castles of Callao).

=== Independence Era ===
In 1806, viceroy José Fernando de Abascal y Sousa ordered the construction of a storage depot for arms, artillery and water to supply up to 2,000 soldiers for up to four months. On 21 January 1816, Admiral Guillermo Brown blockaded the port of Callao, captured several royalist boats and proceeded to bombard the port. However, they were soon repulsed by the coastal batteries of the fortress.

During 16 January 1819, the fortress repulsed an attack from Admiral Lord Thomas Cochrane during the government of viceroy Joaquín de la Pezuela. This incident forced General José de San Martín to invade Lima from Pisco. Once the declaration of independence was decreed, General San Martín ordered to siege the fortress. The siege ended in 1821, when royalist General José de La Mar surrendered to Republican forces. However, the fortress was captured again by the Spaniards under Brigadier José Ramón Rodil y Campillo. Only in 1826, would the fortress return to the republicans after Brigadier Rodil y Campillo surrendered and ended the Second siege of Callao.

== Gallery ==
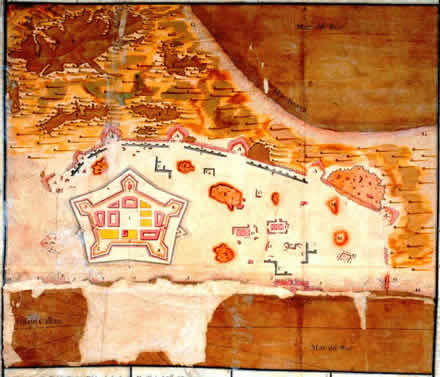
Plan of the Royal Phillip's Castle and Callao seaport

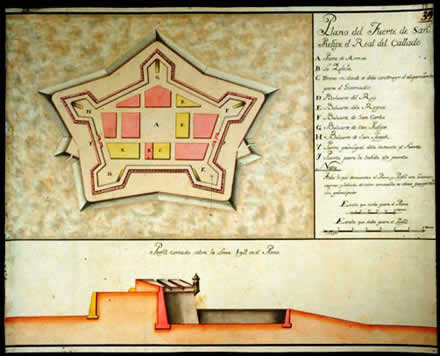
Plan of the Royal Phillip's Castle

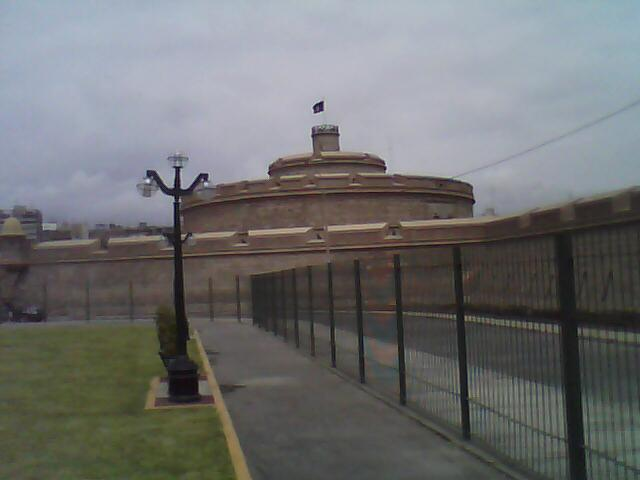
King's Tower

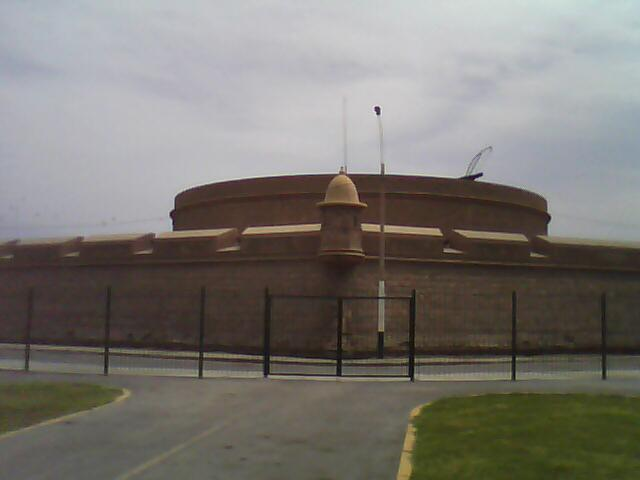
Queen's Tower

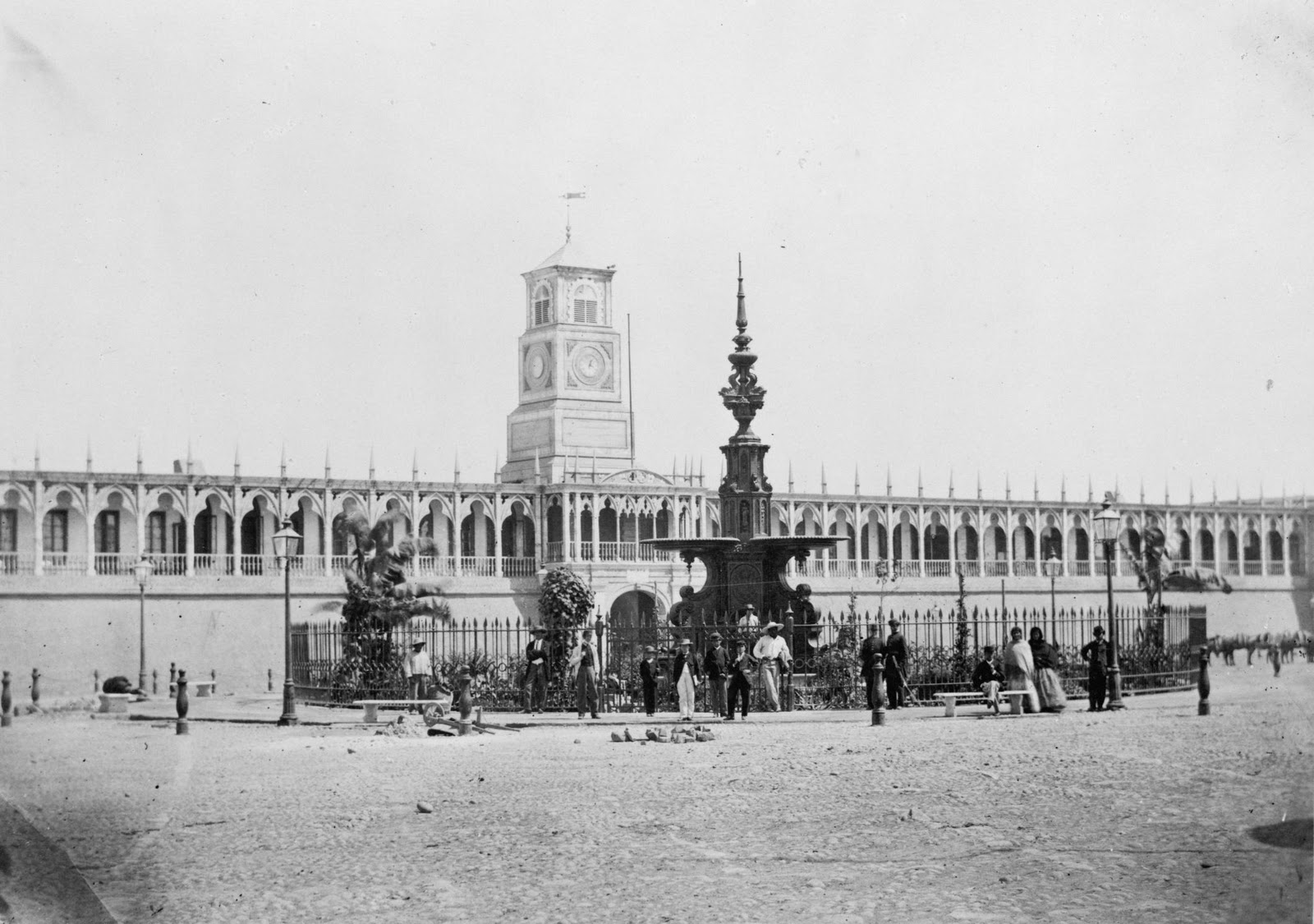
Callao seaport's Custom-House in Royal Phillip's Castle

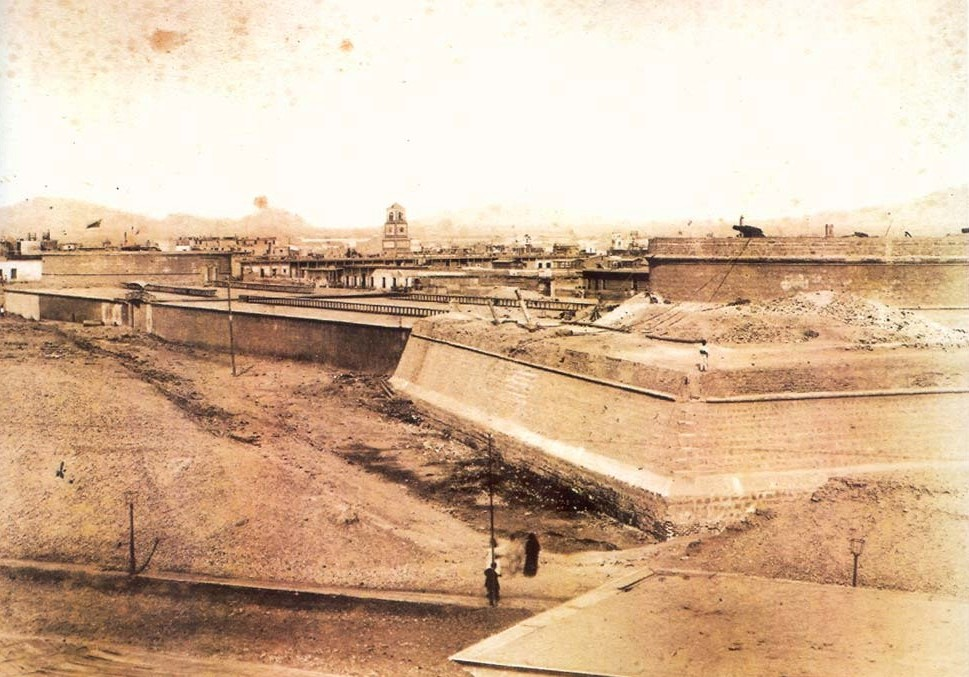
Queen's Tower armed with a Vavasseur cannon in 1880

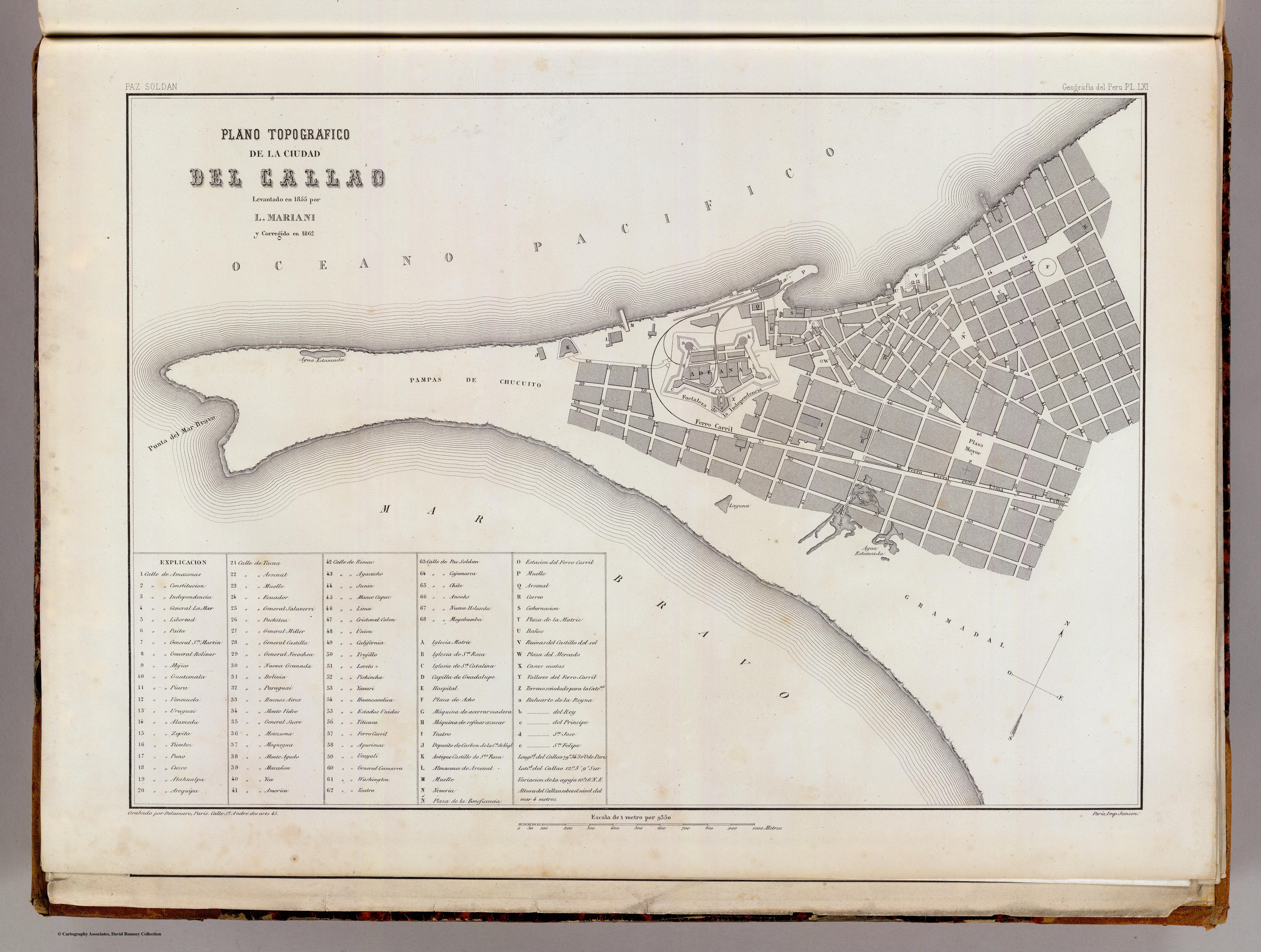
Callao, 1862

Panorama outside Casa del Gobernador

== Bibliography ==
- GUIDE TO PERU, Handbook for travelers, 6th. Edition, by Gonzalo de Reparaz Ruiz, Ediciones de Arte Rep, Lima – Perú, Book edited in English language by the Fondo de Promoción Turística del Perú – FOPTUR, pages 114–115.
- Higgins, James (editor). The Emancipation of Peru: British Eyewitness Accounts, 2014. Online at https://sites.google.com/site/jhemanperu
