= Spanish expeditionary forces in the Mexican War of Independence =

In attempts to retain or re-establish control over Spanish America, the Spanish monarchy sent several expeditionary forces during the Spanish American wars of independence.

The largest to reach the Americas was the expeditionary army of Costa Firme, with over 10,000 troops under General Morillo, which carried out the Spanish reconquest of New Granada (1815–1816). An even larger force of some 20,000 men assembled in Cádiz never sailed, owing to Riego's pronunciamiento in 1820.

Reinforcements were sent to New Spain between 1812 and 1817. Later, after Mexican independence in 1821, a Spanish garrison was sent from Cuba to occupy Spain's last outpost in Mexico, the fortress of San Juan de Ulúa, where it remained until surrendering in 1825. Finally, a force under Isidro Barradas attempted to regain control of Mexico in 1829.

The first Spanish expedition sent to support the royalists of New Spain arrived in 1812, after the Hidalgo revolt had already been defeated. These units were not numerically significant and could not decide the war on their own. Their value was mainly political and material: integrated into the army of New Spain, they helped hold the royalist forces together.

Their task was to reinforce the army of the viceroyalty. The troops had to move inland quickly to escape the vómito negro (yellow fever) of the coast. Once inland, the regiments were scattered across the vast territory of the viceroyalty, and their battalions ended up broken into detachments assigned to garrisons, convoy escorts and counter-insurgency operations. In this way, the small expeditionary contingents helped sustain a counter-insurgency war that dragged on for years.

After Riego's pronunciamiento in 1820 and the political crisis that followed in Spain, the liberal government stopped sending pay, supplies and reinforcements, and the royalist armies were left to fend for themselves. The political shift in Mexico led most of their men to join Iturbide in 1821, including peninsular commanders such as Melchor Álvarez, Rafael Bracho and Domingo Estanislao de Luaces. In December 1821, following the agreement to leave Mexico, the Spanish troops who had remained loyal marched to the ports for re-embarkation: 492 officers and 3,699 sergeants, corporals and soldiers. They were repatriated to Spain via Havana, reached Cádiz between 27 April and 3 October 1822, and were quartered in Mahón, Murcia, Alicante, Valencia and Madrid.

== List of Spanish expeditionary forces ==
=== Counter insurgency (1812-1821) ===
Period	year	Number of men	Units and Commanders (units changed names in 1820)
European Expeditions; 1812 - 1817 flag	year 1812	total men 3857	Unit / soldiers / Officers; Battalion Asturias (Mallorca) / 270 men / -; Battalion Lobera (Infante Don Carlos) / 847 men / Francisco Bucelli, teniente coronel; Regiment América (Murcia) / 817 men, one Battalion / Juan José Olazábal; Battalion Castilla (Voluntarios de Castilla) / 649 men / Francisco Hevia; Battalion Zamora / 910 men / Rafael Bracho; Battalion Fernando VII -expediciónario- / 364 men / Ángel Díaz del Castro, teniente coronel
European Expeditions; 1812 - 1817 flag	year 1813	men total 1895	Unit / soldiers / officers; Battalion Extremadura / 995 men / coronel Benito Armiñan; Battalion Saboya (Reina) / 900 men / coronel Melchor Álvarez
European Expeditions; 1812 - 1817 flag	Year 1815	men total 1749	Brigadier Fernando Miyares y Mancebo, commander of expedition; unit / soldiers / officers; Regiment Órdenes Militares / 1126 men, 2 Battalions / Coronel Francisco LLamas; Battalion Voluntarios de Navarra (Barcelona) / 623 men / Coronel José Ruiz
European Expeditions; 1812 - 1817 flag	Year 1817	men total 1547	Mariscal de Campo Pascual Liñan, commander of expedition.; unit / soldiers / officers; Regiment Zaragoza / 2 Battalions / brigadier Domingo Luaces

=== Defense of San Juan de Ulúa (1821-1825) ===
	Date	Expeditions	Units
San Juan de Ulúa Bandera de la flota naval y de las fortalezas españolas Fortress San Juan de Ulúa (Veracruz)	August 7, 1821	Cuerpo expedicionario de la Isla de Cuba	Brigadier Juan Rodríguez de la Torre, comandante en jefe; Unit / Soldiers; 1º Company mixed form Regiments Habana and Luisiana, and Battalions Málaga, Cataluña and Tarragona. / 105 men; 2º Company de Battalion Pardos de la Habana. / 75 men; 3º Company de Battalion Morenos de la Habana. / 75 men; 4º Company de voluntarios. / 105 men
San Juan de Ulúa Bandera de la flota naval y de las fortalezas españolas Fortress San Juan de Ulúa (Veracruz)	August 1821	1º reinforcement	299 men
San Juan de Ulúa Bandera de la flota naval y de las fortalezas españolas Fortress San Juan de Ulúa (Veracruz)	October 1822	2º reinforcement	1º Commander of fortress Brigadier Francisco Lemaur.; 834 soldiers y 44 officers, y 100 artillery men Battalion Cataluña and Málaga.
San Juan de Ulúa Bandera de la flota naval y de las fortalezas españolas Fortress San Juan de Ulúa (Veracruz)	December 24, 1822	1º relief	354 soldiers y 8 officers Battalion Málaga; 75 soldiers Battalion Tarragona
San Juan de Ulúa Bandera de la flota naval y de las fortalezas españolas Fortress San Juan de Ulúa (Veracruz)	March 1823	2º relief	numbers similar to 1º relief from battalions Cataluña, Tarragona y Málaga.
San Juan de Ulúa Bandera de la flota naval y de las fortalezas españolas Fortress San Juan de Ulúa (Veracruz)	August 1823	3º relief	200 men.
San Juan de Ulúa Bandera de la flota naval y de las fortalezas españolas Fortress San Juan de Ulúa (Veracruz)	July 1824	4º relief	227 men from Battalions Cataluña and Málaga.
San Juan de Ulúa Bandera de la flota naval y de las fortalezas españolas Fortress San Juan de Ulúa (Veracruz)	January 1825	5º relief (last)	300 men battalions Cataluña and Tarragona, plus 116 men from Battalion Pardos y Morenos de Cuba.; 2º Commander of fortress, brigadier José Coppinger.

=== Expedition of Isidro Barradas (1829) ===
Division of Vanguard (1829)

flag

- Total 3,000 men

Commander

- Brigadier General Isidro Barradas Valdés

Units

- Regiment de la Corona (3 Battalions )
  - I Battalion Rey Fernando
  - II Battalion Reina Amalia
  - III Battalion Real Borbón
- Squadron of cavalry (dismounted) (incomplete)
- Company of artillery (short)
