= Battle of Mariel =

Naval battle

- Part of Spanish attempts to reconquer Mexico
Date	10–11 February 1828
Location	Mariel, Cuba
Result	Spanish victory

Belligerents
Mexican Republic	Spain

Commanders and leaders
David Henry Porter †	Melitón Pérez del Camino

Strength
1 brig	1 frigate

Casualties and losses
80 killed 1 brig captured	Unknown; 1 frigate damaged

The Battle of Mariel was a small-scale naval engagement fought between the First Mexican Republic and the Spanish Empire near the Cuban port town of Mariel. The battle resulted in a Spanish victory, with the Mexican navy losing the brig Guerrero.

== Background ==
During the Mexican War of Independence (1808 to 1821), the former Spanish colony of New Spain successfully declared independence and defeated the Spanish colonial army. New Spain was reconstituted into the First Mexican Empire, with the new nation gaining de facto independence with the signing of the Treaty of Córdoba in 1821. However, the Spanish government did not accept the legitimacy of the treaty and continued to interfere in Mexican affairs, maintaining military garrisons along the Mexican coast. These Spanish holdouts suffered a major setback in 1825 when the Mexican Army captured the key port city of Veracruz, but Spain continued to launch armed expeditions against Mexico from the nearby island of Cuba. The island colony also served as an important Spanish naval base, allowing the Spanish to harass Mexican trade in the Gulf of Mexico and project power in the region.

== Battle ==
Seeking to challenge Spanish control of the gulf, the Mexican Navy began to conduct sorties in the region in the mid-1820s. In early 1828 a squadron of three brigs under the command of Commodore David Porter began to sortie into the gulf, seeking to disrupt Spanish shipping. One of the three brigs was the 22-gun Guerrero, which had recently taken on a crew of American volunteers in New Orleans and was under the command of Porter's nephew, Captain David Henry Porter.

On morning of 10 February, Captain Porter sighted the tall masts of merchant ships in the port town of Mariel, and so decided to raid the port. Approaching the port, Porter discovered and attacked the Spanish brig Marte, an armed schooner, and a group of merchant ships. Porter succeeded in scattering the Spanish ships, but word of his raid reached the nearby city of Havana; around 5:00 in the afternoon, the heavily armed^{A} frigate Lealtad arrived off of Mariel, and soon began to pursue the Guerrero. Porter attempted to flee towards Key West, but by the morning of the 11th it was clear Lealtad was capable of overtaking the Mexican brig, and so Porter decided instead to stand and fight. Around 6:00 in the morning, Guerrero turned and was engaged by Lealtad, resulting in a two and a half hour battle between the two. Using its superior size and armament, the Spanish warship began to wear the Mexican vessel down, with Captain Porter and over eighty of Guerrero's crew being killed in action. Guerrero in turn inflicted heavy damage on Lealtad. Eventually the Mexican brig was forced to surrender, with the ship's crew (including future US admiral David Dixon Porter) being imprisoned in Havana. The battle at Mariel became the last ship-to-ship engagement between the Mexican and Spanish navies.

== Aftermath ==
Guerrero was repaired and entered Spanish naval service under the name El Cautivo. The conduct and bravery of Guerrero's crew was commended by the Spanish, who treated the crew humanely.^{B} After the defeat at Mariel, the Mexican Navy continued to operate in the gulf, though the loss of Guerrero was a major blow to the navy's strength.

== Notes ==
A. One source (inscription on monument to Porter as transcribed by Howe) describes Lealtad as carrying 54 guns, while another (Jr, Kennard R. Wiggins) describes 64 guns.
B. Sources differ on the treatment of the prisoners, with one 19th-century source describing it as harsher and a more recent scholarly source (Flaccus, Elmer W) describing it as humane.
