= Royalist (Spanish American independence) =

Supporters of the Spanish monarchy during the Spanish-American independence wars

- Realistas
- Spanish Empire according to the Constitution of Cádiz (1812)
- Leader
- Political leader: Ferdinand VII of Spain
- Constitutional monarchy: Cortes of Cádiz; Trienio Liberal
- Absolute monarchy: Ominous Decade
- Dates active: 1810–1829
- Allegiance: Kingdom of Spain and the Indies (the Spains)
- Wars: Spanish American wars of independence

The royalists were the people of Hispanic America (mostly from native and indigenous peoples) and Europeans that fought to preserve the integrity of the Spanish monarchy during the Spanish American wars of independence.

Royalists recognized the authorities governing from the Iberian Peninsula against the Bonapartists. Spanish liberalism assumed power during the Peninsular War. In 1808, the Supreme Central Junta of Spain and the Indies, and from 1810 the Cortes of Cádiz, governed in the name of the absent king and created a pan-Hispanic state. Subsequently, in 1814, the Royalists recognized Ferdinand VII following the absolutist restoration of the throne, returned by Napoleon Bonaparte. In 1820, a division emerged within the royalist camp between the liberals, who supported the uprising of the Trienio Liberal and sought to restore the liberal state of the Cortes of Cádiz, and the absolutists, supporters of Ferdinand VII and the restored traditional state. Another French military occupation until 1827 secured the absolutist throne.

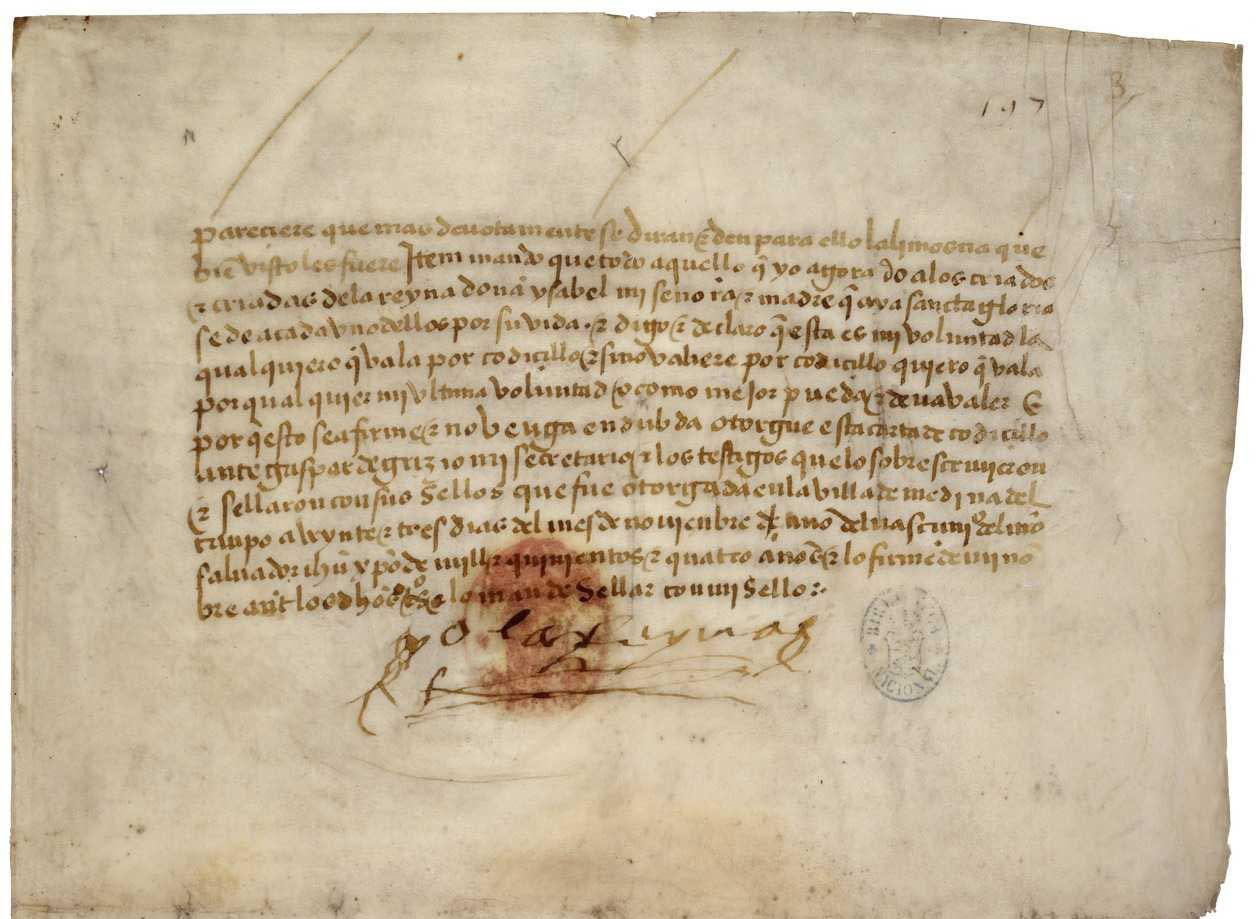
The Testament of Isabella the Catholic, dictated on October 12, 1504, had the character of a fundamental law of the monarchy, and in it is expressed the commitment to the evangelization and Hispanization of the New World.

== Political evolution ==
Royalist territories in Western South America after the Battle of Chacabuco of 1818. Chiloé and Valdivia were royalist enclaves accessible only by sea.

The creation of juntas in Spanish America in 1810 was a direct reaction to developments in Spain during the previous two years. In 1808 Ferdinand VII had been convinced to abdicate by Napoleon in his favor, who granted the throne to his brother, Joseph Bonaparte. The Supreme Central Junta had led a resistance to Joseph's government and the French occupation of Spain, but suffered a series of reverses resulting in the loss of the northern half of the country. On February 1, 1810, French troops took Seville and gained control of most of Andalusia. The Supreme Junta retreated to Cádiz and dissolved itself in favor of a Regency Council of Spain and the Indies. As news of this arrived throughout Spanish America during the next three weeks to nine months—depending on time it took goods and people to travel from Spain—political fault lines appeared. Royal officials and Spanish Americans were split between those who supported the idea of maintaining the status quo—that is leaving all the government institutions and officers in place—regardless of the developments in Spain, and those who thought that the time had come to establish local rule, initially through the creation of juntas, to preserve the independence of Spanish America from the French or from a rump government in Spain that could no longer legitimately claim to rule a vast empire. At first, the juntas claimed to carry out their actions in the name of the deposed king and did not formally declare independence. Juntas were successfully established in Venezuela, Río de la Plata and New Granada, and there were unsuccessful movements to do so in other regions. A few juntas initially chose to recognize the Regency, nevertheless the creation of juntas challenged the authority of all sitting royal officials and the right of the government in Spain to rule in the Americas.

In the months following the establishment of the Regency, it became clear that Spain was not lost, and furthermore the government was effectively reconstituting itself. The Regency successfully convened the Cortes Generales, the traditional parliament of the Spanish Monarchy, which in this case included representatives from the Americas. The Regency and Cortes began issuing orders to, and appointing, royal officials throughout the empire. Those who supported the new government came to be called "royalists." Those that supported the idea of maintaining independent juntas called themselves "patriots," and a few among them were proponents of declaring full, formal independence from Spain. As the Cortes instituted liberal reforms and worked on drafting a constitution, a new division appeared among royalists. Conservatives (often called "absolutists" in the historiography) did not want to see any innovations in government, while liberals supported them. These differences would become more acute after the restoration of Ferdinand VII, because the king opted to support the conservative position.

=== Role of regional rivalry ===
Regional rivalry also played an important role in the internecine wars that broke out in Spanish America as a result of the juntas. The disappearance of a central, imperial authority—and in some cases of even a local, viceregal authority (as in the cases of New Granada and Río de la Plata)—initiated a prolonged period of balkanization in many regions of Spanish America. It was not clear which political units should replace the empire, and there were – among the criollo elites at least – no new or old national identities to replace the traditional sense of being Spaniards. The original juntas of 1810 appealed first, to sense of being Spanish, which was juxtaposed against the French threat; second, to a general American identity, which was juxtaposed against the Peninsula which was lost to the French; and third, to a sense of belonging to the local province, the patria in Spanish. More often than not, juntas sought to maintain a province's independence from the capital of the former viceroyalty or captaincy general, as much as from the Peninsula itself. Armed conflicts broke out between the provinces over the question of whether some provinces were to be subordinate to others in the manner that they had been under the crown. This phenomenon was particularly evident in New Granada and Río de la Plata. This rivalry also leads some regions to adopt the opposing political cause from their rivals. Peru seems to have remained strongly royalist in large part because of its rivalry with Río de la Plata, to which it had lost control of Upper Peru when the latter was elevated to a viceroyalty in 1776. The creation of juntas in Río de la Plata allowed Peru to regain formal control of Upper Peru for the duration of the wars.

=== Restoration of Ferdinand VII ===
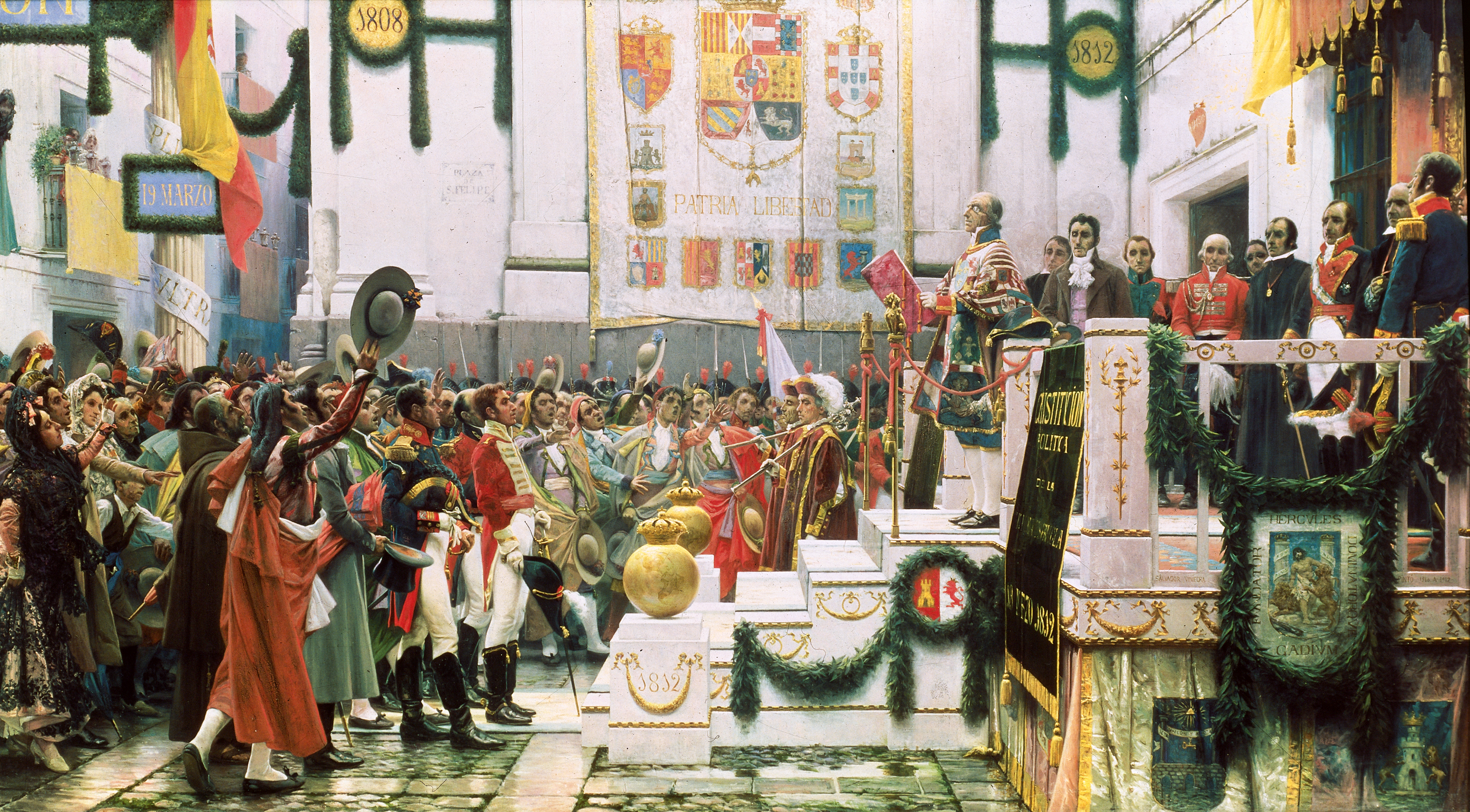
Constitution of Cádiz, The promulgation of the Constitution of 1812, work of Salvador Viniegra (Museum of the Cortes of Cádiz).

The restoration of Ferdinand VII signified an important change, since most of the political and legal changes done on both sides of the Atlantic—the myriad of juntas, the Cortes in Spain, and several of the congresses in the Americas that evolved out of the juntas, and the many constitutions and new legal codes—had been done in his name. Once in Spain Ferdinand VII realized that he had significant support from conservatives in the general population and the hierarchy of the Spanish Catholic Church, and so on May 4, he repudiated the Spanish Constitution of 1812 and ordered the arrest of liberal leaders who had created it on May 10. Ferdinand justified his actions by stating that the Constitution and other changes had been made by a Cortes assembled in his absence and without his consent. He also declared all of the juntas and constitutions written in Spanish America invalid and restored the former law codes and political institutions.

This, in effect, constituted a definitive break with two groups that could have been allies of Ferdinand VII: the autonomous governments, which had not yet declared formal independence, and Spanish liberals who had created a representative government that would fully include the overseas possessions and was seen as an alternative to independence by many in New Spain (today Mexico), Central America, the Caribbean, Venezuela, Quito (Ecuador), Peru, Upper Peru (Bolivia) and Chile.

The provinces of New Granada had maintained independence from Spain since 1810, unlike neighboring Venezuela, where royalists and pro-independence forces had exchanged control of the region several times. To pacify Venezuela and to retake New Granada, Spain organized in 1815 the largest armed force it ever sent to the New World, consisting of 10,500 troops and nearly sixty ships. (See, Spanish reconquest of New Granada). Although this force was crucial in retaking a solidly pro-independence region like New Granada, its soldiers were eventually spread out throughout Venezuela, New Granada, Quito, and Peru and were lost to tropical diseases, diluting their impact on the war. More importantly, the majority of the royalist forces were composed, not of soldiers sent from the peninsula, but of Spanish Americans. Other Spanish Americans were moderates who decided to wait and see what would come out of the restoration of normalcy. In fact, in areas of New Spain, Central America, and Quito, governors found it expedient to leave the elected constitutional ayuntamientos in place for several years to prevent conflict with the local society. Liberals on both sides of the Atlantic, nevertheless, continued to conspire to bring back a constitutional monarchy, ultimately succeeding in 1820. The most dramatic example of transAtlantic collaboration is perhaps Francisco Javier Mina's expedition to Texas and northern Mexico in 1816 and 1817.

Spanish Americans in royalist areas who were committed to independence had already joined guerrilla movements. Ferdinand's actions did set areas outside of the control of the royalist armies on the path to full independence. The governments of these regions, which had their origins in the juntas of 1810—and even moderates there who had entertained a reconciliation with the crown—now saw the need to separate from Spain, if they were to protect the reforms they had enacted.

=== Restoration of the Spanish Constitution and independence ===
Spanish liberals finally had success in forcing Ferdinand VII to restore the Constitution on January 1, 1820, when Rafael Riego headed a rebellion among troops that had been gathered for a large expeditionary force to be sent to the Americas. By March 7, the royal palace in Madrid was surrounded by soldiers under the command of General Francisco Ballesteros, and three days later on March 10, the besieged Ferdinand VII, now a virtual prisoner, agreed to restore the Constitution.

Riego's revolt had two significant effects on the war in the Americas. First, in military matters, the large numbers of reinforcements, that were especially needed to retake New Granada and defend the Viceroyalty of Peru, would never arrive. Furthermore, as the royalist situation became more desperate in region after region, the army experienced wholesale defections of units to the patriot side. Second, in political matters, the reinstitution of a liberal regime changed the terms under which the Spanish government sought to engage the insurgents. The new government naively assumed that the insurgents were fighting for Spanish liberalism and that the Spanish Constitution could still be the basis of reconciliation between the two sides. The government implemented the Constitution and held elections in the overseas provinces, just as in Spain. It also ordered military commanders to begin armistice negotiations with the insurgents with the promise that they could participate in the restored representative government.

The Spanish Constitution, it turned out, served as the basis for independence in New Spain and Central America, since in the two regions it was a coalition of conservative and liberal royalist leaders who led the establishment of new states. The restoration of the Spanish Constitution and representative government was enthusiastically welcomed in New Spain and Central America. Elections were held, local governments formed and deputies sent to the Cortes. Among liberals, however, there was fear that the new regime would not last, and among conservatives and the Church, that the new liberal government would expand its reforms and anti-clerical legislation. This climate of instability created the conditions for the two sides to ally. This alliance coalesced towards the end of 1820 behind Agustín de Iturbide, a colonel in the royal army, who at the time was assigned to destroy the guerrilla forces led by Vicente Guerrero. Instead, Iturbide entered into negotiations, which resulted in the Plan of Iguala, which would establish New Spain as an independent kingdom, with Ferdinand VII as its king. With the Treaty of Córdoba, the highest Spanish official in Mexico approved the Plan of Iguala, and although the Spanish government never ratified this treaty, it did not have the resources to enforce its rejection. Ultimately, it was the royal army in Mexico that ultimately brought about that nation's independence.

Central America gained its independence along with New Spain. The regional elites supported the terms of the Plan of Iguala and orchestrated the union of Central America with the Mexican Empire in 1821. Two years later following Iturbide's downfall, the region, except Chiapas, peacefully seceded from Mexico in July 1823, establishing the Federal Republic of Central America. The new state existed for seventeen years, centrifugal forces pulling the individual provinces apart by 1840.

In South America independence was spurred by the pro-independence fighters that had held out for the past half-decade. José de San Martín and Simón Bolívar inadvertently led a continental-wide pincer movement from southern and northern South America that liberated most of the Spanish American nations on that continent and secured the independence of the Southern Cone had more or less experienced since 1810. In South America, royalist soldiers, officers (such as Andrés de Santa Cruz), and whole units also began to desert or defect to the patriots in large numbers as the royal army's situation became dire. During the end of 1820 in Venezuela, after Bolívar and Pablo Morillo concluded a cease-fire, many units crossed lines knowing that Spanish control of the region would not last. The situation repeated itself in Peru from 1822 to 1825 as republican forces slowly advanced there. Unlike in Mexico, however, the top military and political leadership in these parts of South America came from the patriot side and not the royalists.

The collapse of the constitutional regime in Spain in 1823 had other implications for the war in South America. Royalist officers, split between liberals and conservatives, fought an internecine war among themselves. General Pedro Antonio Olañeta, commander in Upper Peru, rebelled against the liberal viceroy of Peru, José de la Serna, in 1823. This conflict provided an opportunity for the republican forces under the command of Bolívar and Antonio José de Sucre to advance, culminating in the Battle of Ayacucho on December 9, 1824. The royal army of Upper Peru surrendered after Olañeta was killed on April 2, 1825. Former royalists, however, played an important part in the creation of Peru and Bolivia. In Bolivia, royalists, like Casimiro Olañeta, nephew of General Olañeta, gathered in a congress and declared the country's independence from Peru. And in Peru, after Bolívar's forces left the country in 1827, Peruvian leaders undid many of his political reforms.

== Royalist army ==
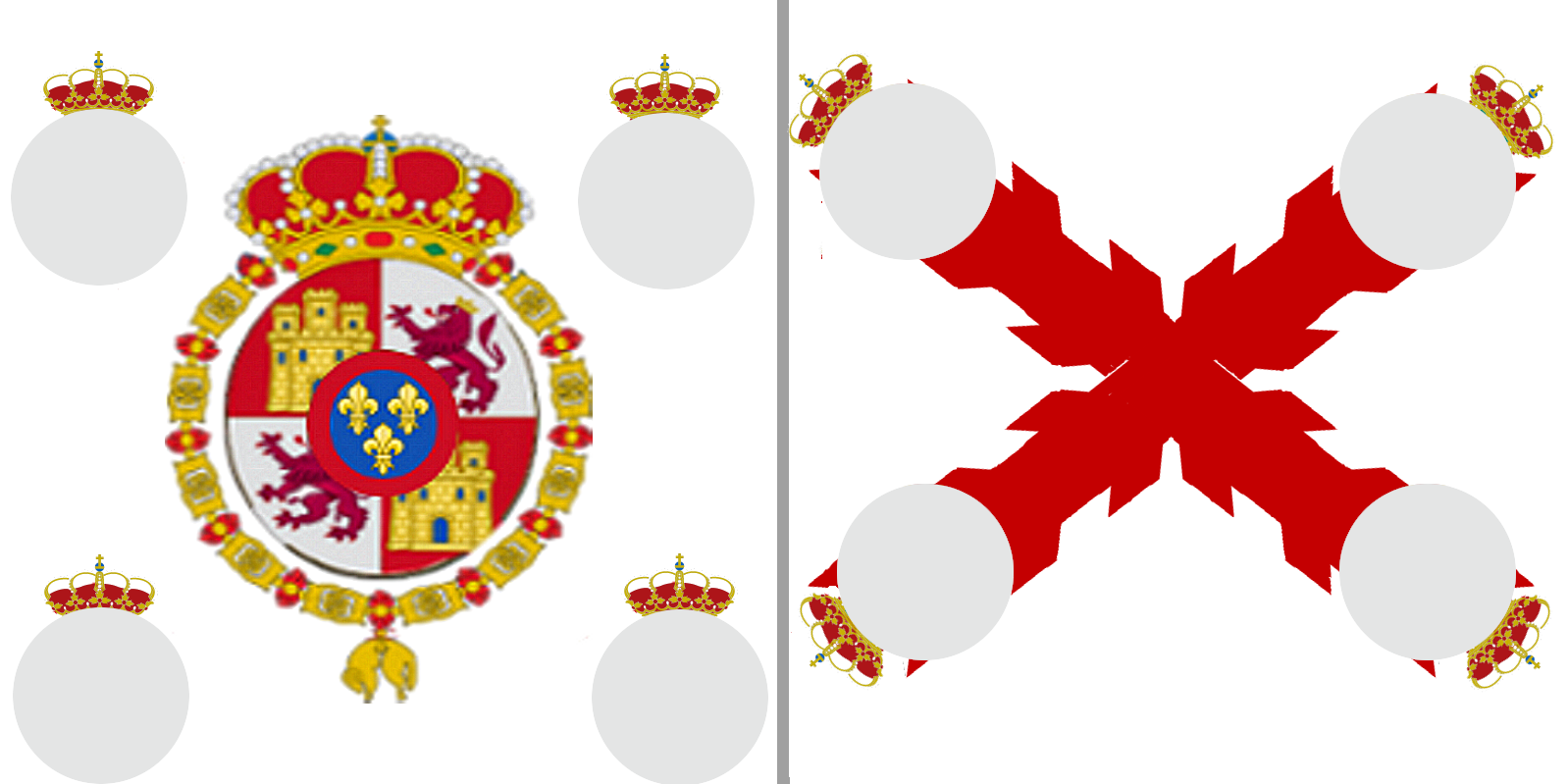
King's and Regimental Colors of the Foot Regiments of Royalist Army modeled on the Cross of Burgundy flag (the local coat of arms would replace the grey circles represented here). Motto: Por la Religión, la Patria y el Rey. Viva Fernando VII

There are two types of units: expeditionary units ( in Spanish: expedicionarios) created in Spain and militias (in Spanish: militias), units which already existed or were created during the conflict in America. The militias, which were composed wholly of militiamen who were residents or natives of Spanish America, were bolstered by the presence of "veteran units" (or "disciplined militia") composed of Peninsular and Spanish American veterans of Spain's wars in Europe and around the globe. The veteran units were expected to form a core of experienced soldiers in the local defenses, whose expertise would be invaluable to the regular militiamen who often lacked sustained military experience, if any. The veteran units were created in the past century as part of the Bourbon Reforms to reinforce Spanish America's defenses against the increasing encroachment of other European powers, such as during the Seven Years' War.

Overall, Europeans formed only about a tenth of the royalist armies in Spanish America, and only about half of the expeditionary units. Since each European soldier casualty was substituted by a Spanish American soldier, over time, there were more and more Spanish American soldiers in the expeditionary units. For example, Pablo Morillo, commander in chief in Venezuela and New Granada, reported that he only had 2,000 European soldiers, in other words, only half of the soldiers of his expeditionary force were European. It is estimated that in the Battle of Maipú only a quarter of the royalist forces were European soldiers, in the Battle of Carabobo about a fifth, and in the Battle of Ayacucho less than 1% was European.

The American militias reflected the racial makeup of the local population. For example, in 1820 the royalist army in Venezuela had 843 white (español), 5,378 Casta, and 980 Native soldiers.

The last royalist armed group in what is today Argentina and Chile, the Pincheira brothers, was an outlaw gang made of European Spanish, American Spanish, Mestizos, and local indigenous peoples. This group was originally based near Chillán in Chile but moved later across the Andes to Patagonia thanks to its alliance with indigenous tribes. In the interior of Patagonia, far from the de facto territory of Chile and the United Provinces, the Pincheira brothers established a permanent encampment with thousands of settlers.

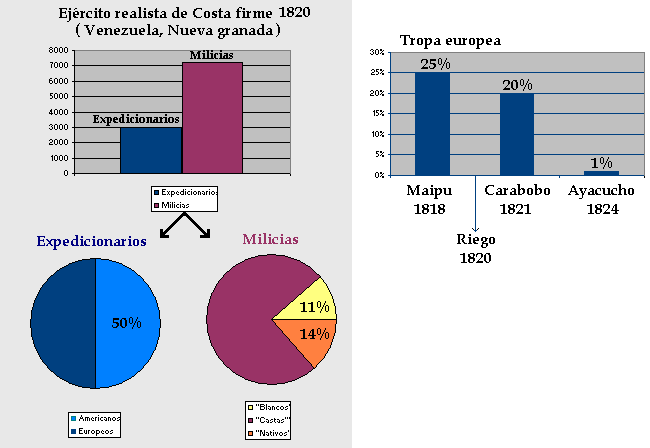
Royalist army

== Royalist leaders ==
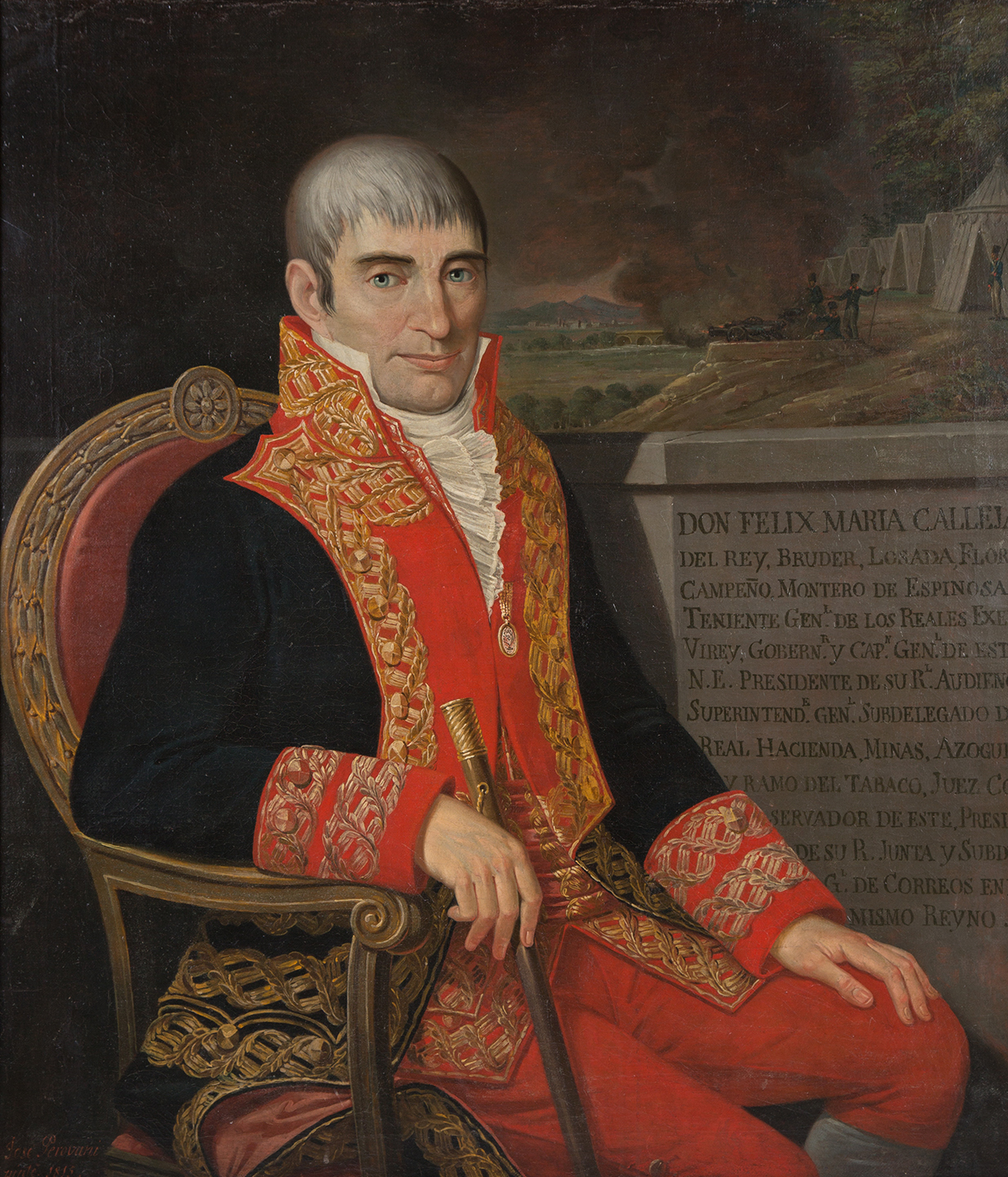
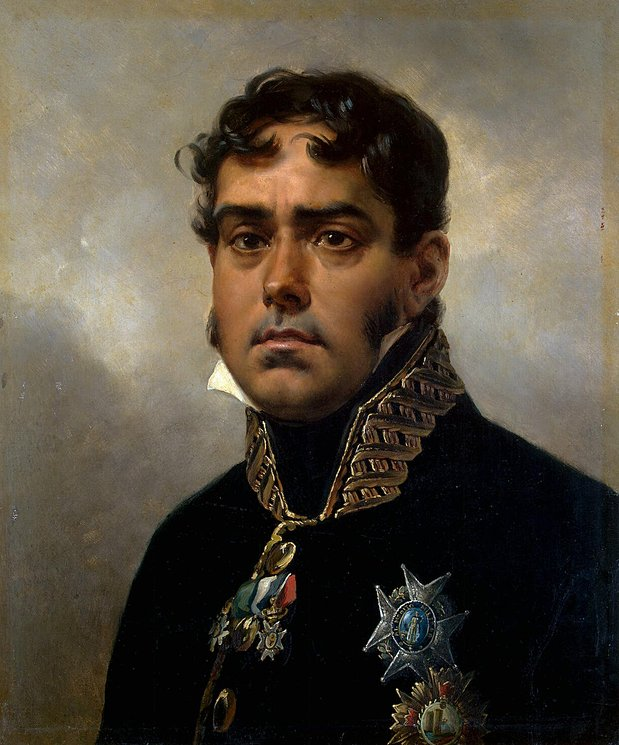
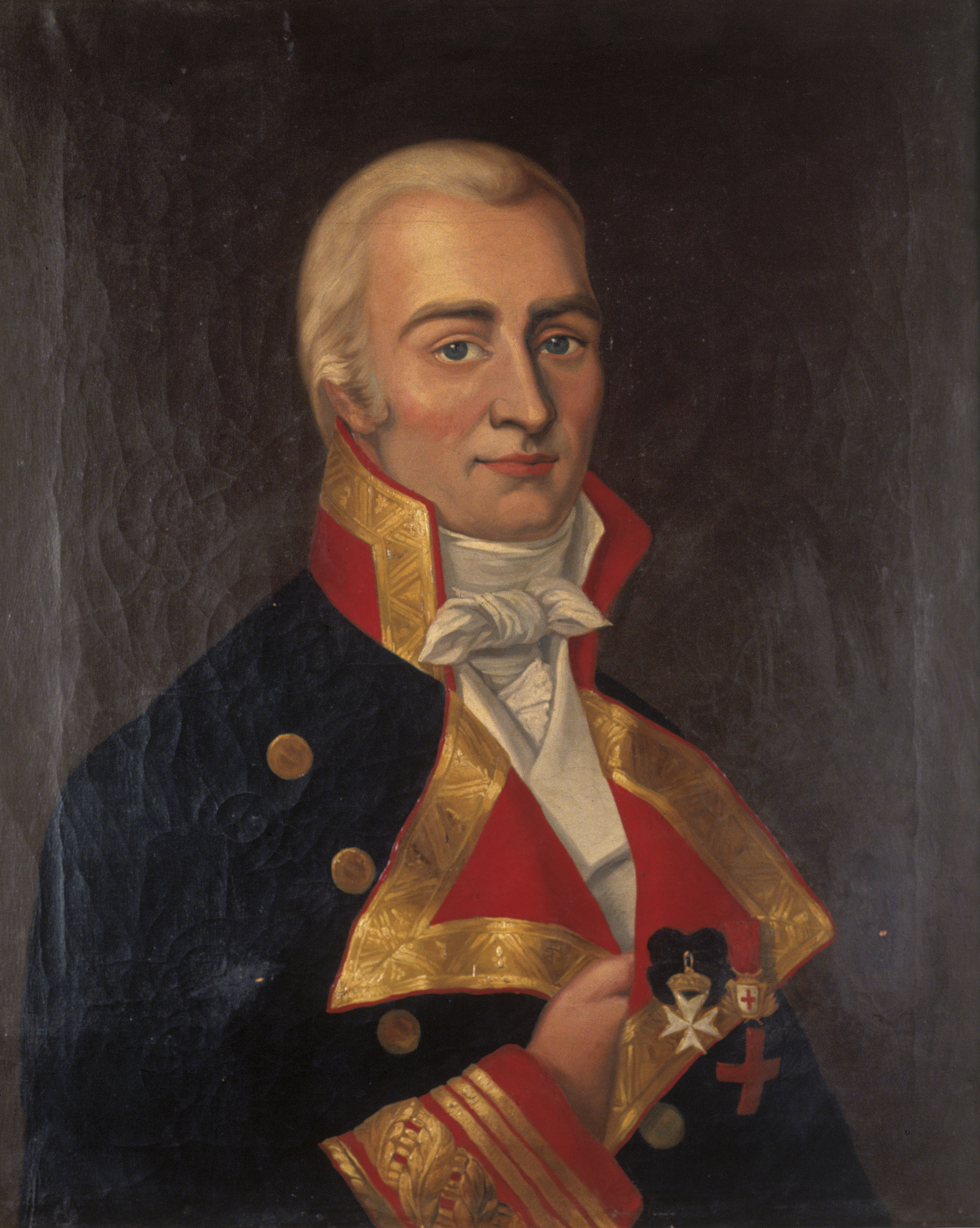
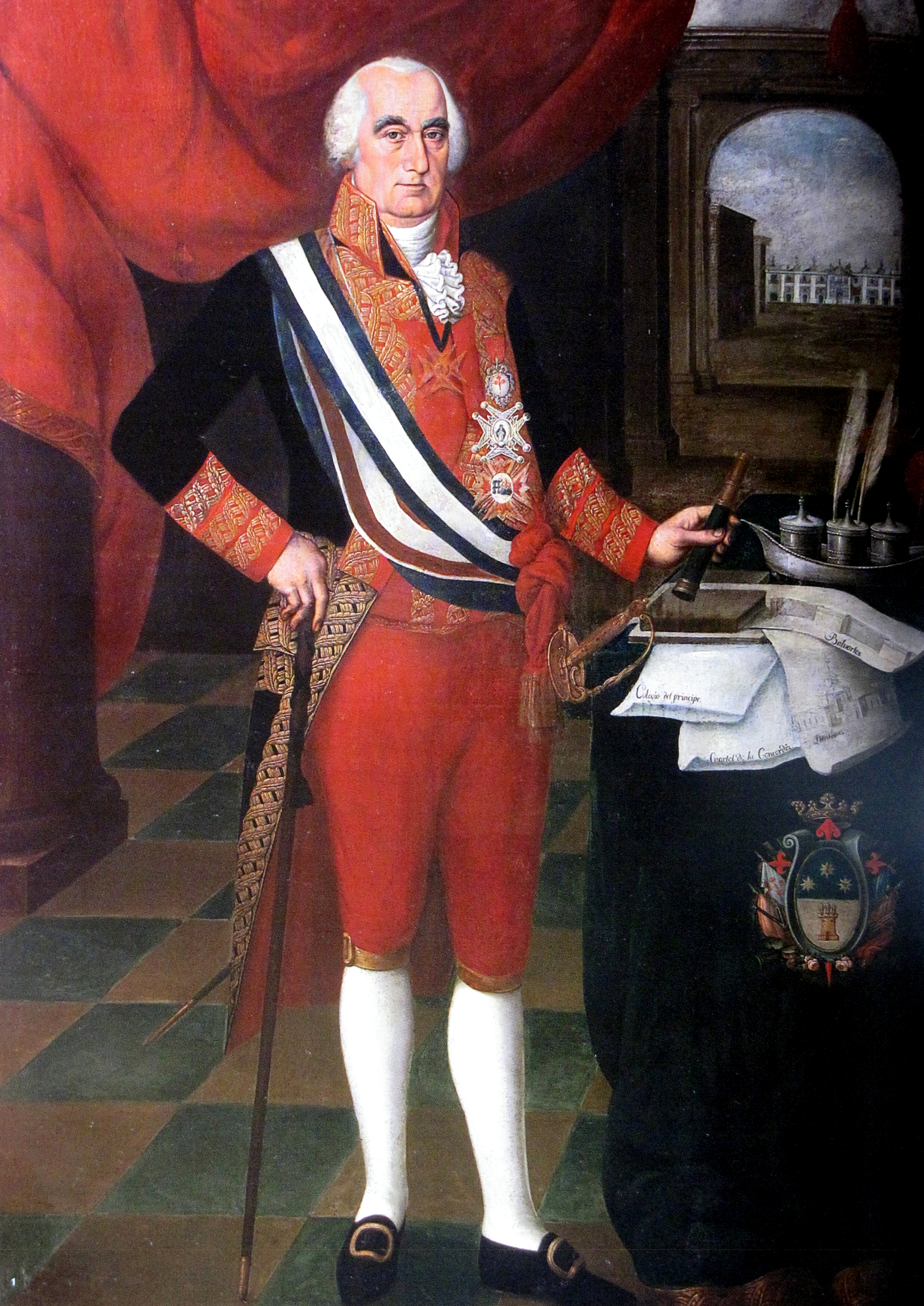
New Spain, Guatemala, Cuba & Puerto Rico Félix María Calleja	New Granada, Venezuela & Quito Pablo Morillo	Río de la Plata, Montevideo & Paraguay Santiago de Liniers	Chile, Lower & Upper Peru José Fernando de Abascal
José de Iturrigaray; Gabriel J. de Yermo; Francisco Xavier Venegas; Félix María Calleja del Rey; Juan Ruiz de Apodaca; Juan O'Donojú; Torcuato Trujillo; Isidro Barradas; José de Bustamante y Guerra; Ángel Laborde	Fernando Miyares y Gonzáles; José Ceballos; Domingo de Monteverde; Agustín Agualongo; José Tomás Boves; Juan Manuel Cajigal; Pablo Morillo; Juan de los Reyes Vargas; Francisco Montalvo; Juan de Sámano, Viceroy of New Granada; Miguel de la Torre y Pando; Francisco Tomás Morales; Sebastián de la Calzada; José María Barreiro Manjón; Melchor Aymerich, President of the Quito Audiencia; Basilio Modesto García, Colonel; Jose Arizabalo, Colonel	Francisco Javier de Elío; Gaspar de Vigodet; Bernardo de Velasco; Santiago de Liniers y Bremond; Vicente Nieto, President of the Charcas Audiencia; José de Córdoba y Rojas; Antonio Olaguer Feliú	José Fernando de Abascal y Sousa; José Manuel de Goyeneche; Pío Tristán; Joaquín de la Pezuela; Pedro Antonio Olañeta; José de la Serna e Hinojosa; José de Canterac; Jerónimo Valdés; José Ramón Rodil y Campillo; Vicente Benavides; Antonio Pareja; Juan Francisco Sánchez; Gabino Gaínza; Mariano Osorio; José Ordóñez; Rafael Maroto; Casimiro Marcó del Pont; Antonio de Quintanilla; Manuel Olaguer Feliú

== Naval commanders and last fortresses ==
Río de la Plata and Pacific Ocean	Gulf of Mexico and Caribbean Sea
Commanders: José María Salazar; José Angel Michelena; Jacinto Romarate; Joaquín de Rocalan; Tomas Blanco Cabreras; Dionisio Capaz; Antonio Vacaro; Roque Guruceta; Strongholds: Montevideo until June 20, 1814; Pasto until July 1824; Guayaquil until October 9, 1820; Talcahuano until November 25, 1820; Valdivia until February 6, 1820; Chiloé until January 15, 1826; El Callao until January 23, 1826	Commanders: Pascual Enrile; Jose María Chacon; Ángel Laborde; José Guerrero; Fortification: San Carlos de la Barra Fortress until July 24, 1823; Puerto Cabello until November 8, 1823; San Juan de Ulua Veracruz until November 18, 1825

== See also ==
- Spanish American wars of independence
- Spanish expeditionary army order of battle
- Reconquista (Spanish America)
- Loyalist (American Revolution), the equivalent of the Royalist in Anglo-America
- Campaigns of the South
- Spanish Empire
- Monarchy of Spain
- Royal Army of Peru

== Bibliography ==
- Kenneth J. Andrien and Lyman L. Johnson (1994). The Political Economy of Spanish America in the Age of Revolution, 1750–1850. Albuquerque, University of New Mexico Press. ISBN 978-0-8263-1489-5
- Timothy Anna (1983). Spain & the Loss of Empire. Lincoln, University of Nebraska Press. ISBN 978-0-8032-1014-1
- Christon I. Archer (ed.) (2000). The Wars of Independence in Spanish America. Willmington, SR Books. ISBN 0-8420-2469-7
- Benson, Nettie Lee (ed.) (1966). Mexico and the Spanish Cortes. Austin: University of Texas Press.
- Michael P. Costeloe (1986). Response to Revolution: Imperial Spain and the Spanish American Revolutions, 1810–1840. Cambridge University Press. ISBN 978-0-521-32083-2
- Jorge I. Domínguez (1980). Insurrection or Loyalty: The Breakdown of the Spanish American Empire. Cambridge, Harvard University Press. ISBN 978-0-674-45635-8
- Jay Kinsbruner. Independence in Spanish America: Civil Wars, Revolutions, and Underdevelopment (Revised edition). Albuquerque, University of New Mexico Press, 2000. ISBN 0-8263-2177-1
- John Lynch. The Spanish American Revolutions, 1808–1826 (2nd edition). New York, W. W. Norton & Company, 1986. ISBN 0-393-95537-0
- Marie Laure Rieu-Millan (1990). Los diputados americanos en las Cortes de Cádiz: Igualdad o independencia. (In Spanish.) Madrid: Consejo Superior de Investigaciones Científicas. ISBN 978-84-00-07091-5
- Jaime E. Rodríguez O. (1998). The Independence of Spanish America. Cambridge University Press. ISBN 0-521-62673-0
- Mario Rodríguez (1978). The Cádiz Experiment in Central America, 1808 to 1826. Berkeley: University of California Press. ISBN 978-0-520-03394-8
- Tomás Straka (2000). "La voz de los vencidos. Ideas del partido realista de Caracas, 1810–1821!. Caracas, Universidad Central de Venezuela, ISBN 978-980-00-1771-5
