= José María Coppinger =

Spanish soldier

8th Governor of Spanish East Florida
- In office January 6, 1816 – July 10, 1821
- Preceded by: Juan José de Estrada
- Succeeded by: Andrew Jackson as Military Governor of American Florida

Personal details
- Born: April 5, 1773 Havana, Captaincy General of Cuba, New Spain
- Died: July 15, 1844 (aged 71) Cárdenas, Cuba
- Spouses: Antonia Maria Josefa Crescencia De Saravia (m. 1797) Narcisa Armenteros Muñoz (m. 1803)
- Profession: Brigadier and governor

José María Coppinger (April 5, 1773 – August 15, 1844) was a Spanish soldier who served in the infantry of the Royal Spanish Army (Ejército de Tierra) and governed East Florida (1816–1821) and several areas in Cuba including Pinar Del Río, Bayamo, the Cuatro Villas (the towns of Trinidad, Santo Espiritu, Villa Clara, San Juan de los Remedios) and Trinidad at various times between 1801 and 1834. He was also a member of the Royal and Military Order of Saint Ferdinand and San Hermenegildo.

== Biography ==
=== Family ===
José María Lopez de Gamarra y Coppinger was born in Havana, Cuba on April 5, 1773, and baptized on April 18 at the Cathedral of Havana. He was the son of Cornelius Coppinger y O'Brien and María de los Dolores López de Gamarra y Hernández Arturo. His father was of Irish origin and engaged in the slave trade, fleeing Ireland because he had hidden a priest in the family house, which was considered treasonous at the time. After immigrating to Spain, Cornelius Coppinger became a naturalized Spanish citizen in 1767. The Cornelius Coppinger family was of successful merchant, military officer, property owner, and civil official origin.

His mother was Cuban but her family was originally from Seville, having emigrated to Cuba in the 17th century. She was the daughter of Francisco López Gamarra y Ayala, a magistrate of the Real Audiencia, Spain's supreme Court in Havana, and accountant of the Royal Treasury.

Coppinger's family was Roman Catholic, the faith in which he was raised. He was the second of four sons.

=== Career ===
Coppinger joined the Spanish army in his youth, attaining the rank of captain. In 1797, he was made Captain of the Regiment of Hibernia and Ayudante Mayor (Adjutant Commander) of the Second Battalion. In 1801 he became brigadier and the military governor of the third largest province in Cuba, Pinar Del Rio, previously known as Nueva Filipinas (New Philippines), and the town of Bayamo. Later, in 1814, he was appointed governor and Capitán a Guerra (a chief magistrate invested with military power) of the Cuatro Villas of Cuba (the towns of Trinidad, Santo Espiritu, Villa Clara, and San Juan de los Remedios).

Colonel Coppinger left this position on January 6, 1816, when he was appointed governor of East Florida to replace Governor Kindelán. That same month he moved to the provincial capital, St. Augustine. In this year, Coppinger sold what is now called Sibbald, a tract of 16,000 acres of timberland between the Trout River and Six Mile Creek, to Charles F. Sibbald of Philadelphia, and on April 16, 1819, he sold another 200 acres at Sondag's Bluff to Isabela Higginbottom.

During Coppinger's tenure, the Nassau-St. Mary's region north of St. Augustine was divided into the regions of Nassau, Upper St. Marys, and Lower St. Marys, with magistrates courts and militia in each. This system ensured minimal complaint from the region to authorities in St. Augustine.

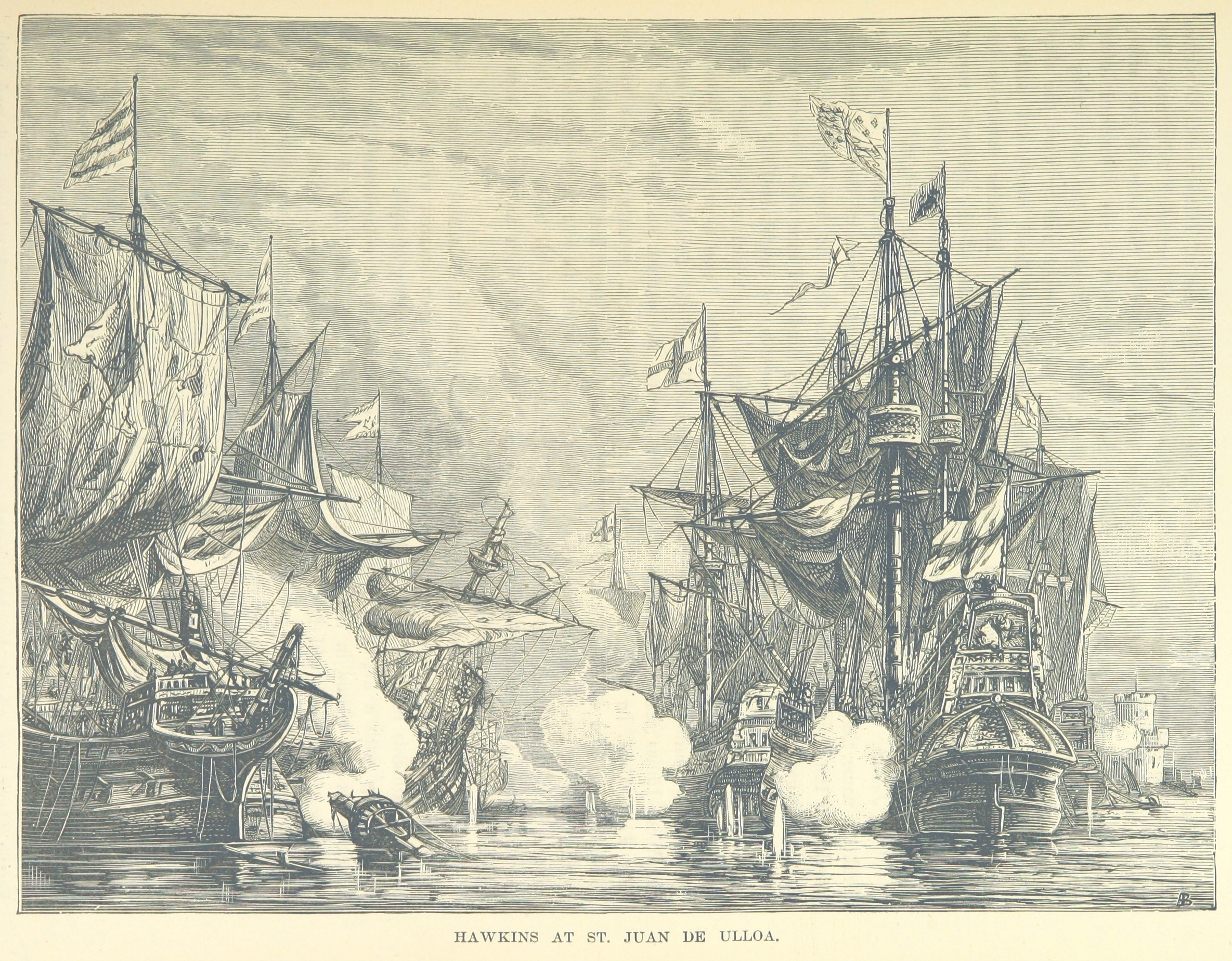
Jose Maria Coppinger participated in the Battle of San Juan de Ulúa on the Mexican side.

Coppinger held this post until July 10, 1821, when Spain ceded Florida to the United States and Coppinger handed over St. Augustine to Colonel Robert Butler, making him the last Spanish governor of the province. Coppinger's superiors had previously sent him confidential instructions, which he received on June 8, to issue orders for the evacuation of the Spanish population of St. Augustine and the rest of East Florida to move them to Cuba, Texas or Mexico. The situation was similar to that faced by the former Spanish governor Melchor Feliú in 1763, who also ordered an evacuation when Florida was ceded to Great Britain with the Spanish defeat in the Seven Years' War. The citizens who immigrated to Cuba in 1821 acquired (or already owned) houses and farmlands on the northeastern coast of Cuba or at the Bay of Pigs. Coppinger also tried to persuade the Seminole chiefs to move their tribespeople to Texas, and ordered that the U.S. flag be flown at the same level as the Spanish flag.

On January 28, 1825, Coppinger relieved General Francisco Lemaur of command of the fortress complex of San Juan de Ulúa in Mexico. In the battle fought there during the attempted Spanish reconquest of Mexico, Coppinger, the last commander of the fortress, finally capitulated on November 21, 1825, after an epidemic of scurvy broke out among the Spanish troops.

In 1834, Coppinger was appointed governor of Trinidad province in the central part of Cuba, an office he occupied until 1837. He spent his last days in Cuba, where he died on August 15, 1844, in Cárdenas.

== Personal life ==
José María Coppinger married María Josefa Saravia y Villegas in Cuba, in the Parish of Santo Christo del Buen Viaje in Havana on July 11, 1797. They had four children: María de la Trinidad, José María, José Cornelius and María Antonia. His second marriage was to Narcisa Armenteros y Muñoz. Coppinger's descendants still live in Cuba and (after the overthrow of Fulgencio Batista and Fidel Castro's assuming power) Florida.
