= Juan José de Estrada =

5th governor of Spanish East Florida
- In office March 1811 – June 1812
- Preceded by: Enrique White
- Succeeded by: Sebastián Kindelán y O'Regan

7th governor of Spanish East Florida
- In office June 1815 – January 1816
- Preceded by: Sebastián Kindelán y O'Regan
- Succeeded by: José María Coppinger

Personal details
- Profession: Military leader, governor, political administrator

Juan José de Estrada was a military leader who served as the governor of East Florida from 1811-1812 and again from 1815-1816. Both of his terms were overwhelmed with tension from the Patriot War between the United States and Spain. In 1816 de Estrada was promoted and left Florida for Havana, Cuba.

== Family background ==
Juan José de Estrada's father, Pedro de Estrada, was one of the senior military leaders defending Havana from British attack and occupation in 1762. Juan José and his brother Ignacio both joined the military like his father and grandfather before him.

== Political career ==
Both of de Estrada's governmental terms were short-lived. His first term as governor was an interim term due to the illness of the former governor, Enrique White. Not all leading Spaniards in Florida welcomed de Estrada's governorship. Manuel López, chief treasury official, did not want a strictly military man in charge of the royal treasury, but he was outvoted. In June of 1811, Estrada received news that Governor White had died and his command was secured. De Estrada's first term started poorly, however, when a massive hurricane hit Florida on October 5, 1811. In response to the hurricane, de Estrada called upon four pre-selected comisarios del barrio, who implemented post-hurricane procedures, visited each house in their neighborhood, and evaluated losses. The four men, José Sánchez, Juan González Montes de Oca, Joaquín Sánchez, and Gaspar Papy, had been chosen for their standing in the community.

In his first term, de Estrada also faced a lack of funds to support his troops, undermanned forces, and a threat from the Georgia border. General George Mathews of Georgia attempted to befriend Seminoles in the interior of East Florida, so de Estrada made the decision to spend what little money he had on gifts to Seminole chiefs.

His second term was also an interim term. In June of 1815, outgoing governor Don Sebastian Kindelan y O'Regan, knight of the order of Santiago and brigadier of the royal armies, alongside Don Manuel de Castilla, captain of the third battalion of the infantry regiment of Cuba which garrisoned St. Augustine, Florida, swore Juan José de Estrada back into office. On June 28, 1815, de Estrada wrote to Spanish diplomat and Spanish envoy to the United States Luis de Onís that he had taken command of Florida and that Sebastian Kindelan had returned to Cuba.

Throughout de Estrada's tenure, skirmishes across the Florida-Georgia border resulted in what became known as the Patriot War. De Estrada communicated with the Governor of Georgia regarding hostilities venturing south of the border. In 1812 he deployed an armed schooner to keep Americans from invading St. Augustine.

In 1816 Juan José de Estrada was promoted to colonel and named sergeant-major of the Plaza and Mayor of Havana. José Coppinger was placed in command of East Florida.

== Legacy ==
Calle Estrada in Fernandina, Florida is possibly named for Governor Estrada.
