= Spanish attempts to reconquer Mexico =

Counter-revolutionary attempted interventions by Spain to reclaim Mexico as a colony

- Part of the Spanish American wars of independence
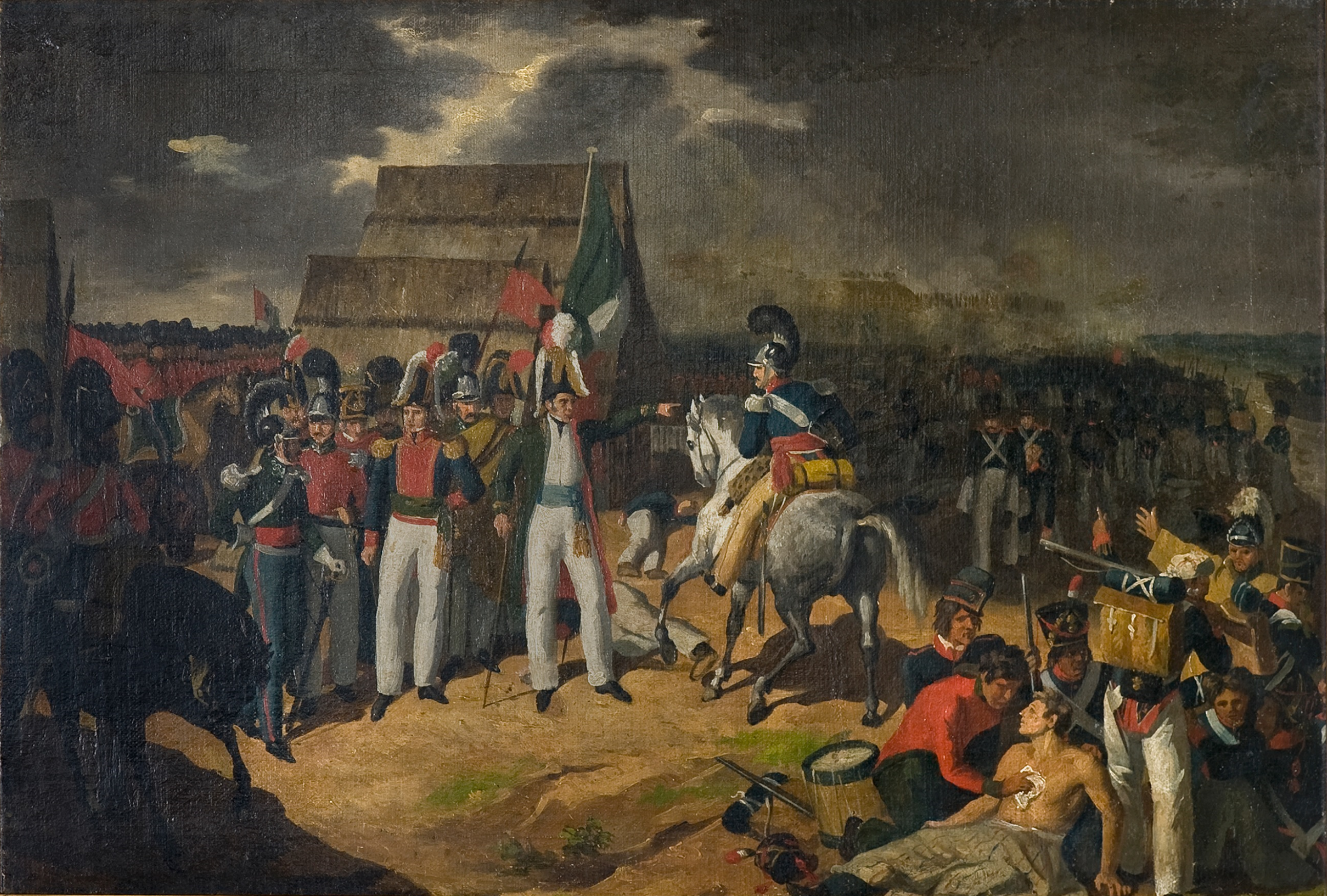
- Military action in Pueblo Viejo, September 1829; Carlos París, 1835
Date	26 October 1821 – 11 September 1829 (7 years, 10 months, 2 weeks and 2 days)
Location	Mexico (Mexico City, Veracruz, Tamaulipas) and Cuba
Result	Mexican victory: Spain recognizes the independence of the United Mexican States in 1836

Belligerents
First Mexican Empire (1821–23); Provisional Government (1823–24); First Mexican Republic (1824–29)	Kingdom of Spain and the Indies (the Spains); Captaincy General of Cuba; San Juan de Ulúa garrison (1821–1825)

Commanders and leaders
(Mexico) Agustín I Guadalupe Victoria; Vicente Guerrero; Miguel Barragán; Antonio López de Santa Anna (Mexico) Manuel de Mier y Terán	(Spain) Ferdinand VII (Spain) Isidro Barradas (Spain) José María Coppinger (Spain) Melitón Pérez del Camino

Strength
4,500 (1829)	3,500 (1829)

Casualties and losses
135 killed in combat (1829)	215 killed in combat (1829) and 1,708 killed by diseases and in combat in the Tampico expedition

Spanish attempts to reconquer Mexico were efforts by the Spanish government to regain possession of its former colony of New Spain, resulting in episodes of war comprised in clashes between the newly born Mexican nation and Spain. The designation mainly covers two periods: the first attempts occurred from 1821 to 1825 and involved the defense of Mexico's territorial waters, while the second period had two stages, including the Mexican expansion plan to take the Spanish-held island of Cuba between 1826 and 1828 and the 1829 expedition of Spanish General Isidro Barradas, which landed on Mexican soil with the object of reconquering Mexican territory. Although the Spanish never regained control of the country, they damaged the fledgling Mexican economy.

The newly independent nation of Mexico was in dire straits after eleven years of fighting its War of Independence. There were no clear plans or guidelines established by the revolutionaries, and internal struggles by different factions for control of the government ensued. Mexico suffered a complete lack of funds to administer a country of over 4.5 million km^{2} and faced the threats of emerging internal rebellions and of invasion by Spanish forces from their base in nearby Cuba.

== Background ==
Mexican independence was officially achieved on September 27, 1821, under the Treaty of Córdoba. Spain did not recognize the treaties, arguing that the viceroy Juan O'Donojú had no authority to recognize the independence of any overseas province. This situation was dangerous to the newly acquired independent status of the nation, which had not yet been recognized by any of the European powers that could support it, and the threat of Spanish reconquest was a constant worry to the leaders of the nascent regime. On May 13, 1822, decrees were issued by the government to imprison anyone who conspired against Mexico's independence.

In addition to its other problems, the main port of entry to the country, San Juan de Ulúa, remained under Spanish domination.

== San Juan de Ulúa ==
General José García Dávila, the governor representing the Spanish Crown in Veracruz, and General Antonio López de Santa Anna had been ordered to surrender the port to the Mexicans; however, the night before the appointed day of October 26, 1821, Gen. Dávila moved all the artillery and ammunition from the port, as well as 200 infantry soldiers, and over 90 thousand pesos belonging to the Spanish government, to the fortress of San Juan de Ulúa. Soon the number of soldiers increased to 2,000 with troops sent by Spain from Cuba to launch the reconquest of Mexico. Since the Mexican forces did not have the weapons and ships to counter these reinforcements, the putative Emperor of Mexico, Agustín de Iturbide, opted for negotiations with the Spanish. Although no agreement was reached, an uneasy peace continued between the two parties.

The arrival of then Brigadier General Antonio López de Santa Anna to the government of the city on September 10, 1822, marks another episode of negotiations between the Mexican authorities of Veracruz and the Spanish of San Juan de Ulúa; these became critical, even more so when the Spanish government relieved Gen. Davila of his charge and replaced him with Brigadier General Francisco Lemaur. The Mexican government, aware of the lack of boats, decided to create a naval force to defeat the Spanish garrison occupying Ulúa, mainly through a blockade. In 1822 it acquired from the United States and the United Kingdom the first ships of the Mexican Navy.

Despite internal political problems in Mexico resulting from the recent overthrow of the short-lived Mexican Empire and the establishment of the Provisional Government, the sight of the Mexicans remained fixed on Ulúa. The talks were suspended when on September 25, 1823, the Spanish bombarded the port of Veracruz, causing the displacement of more than 6,000 civilians who left the city.

=== Capitulation ===
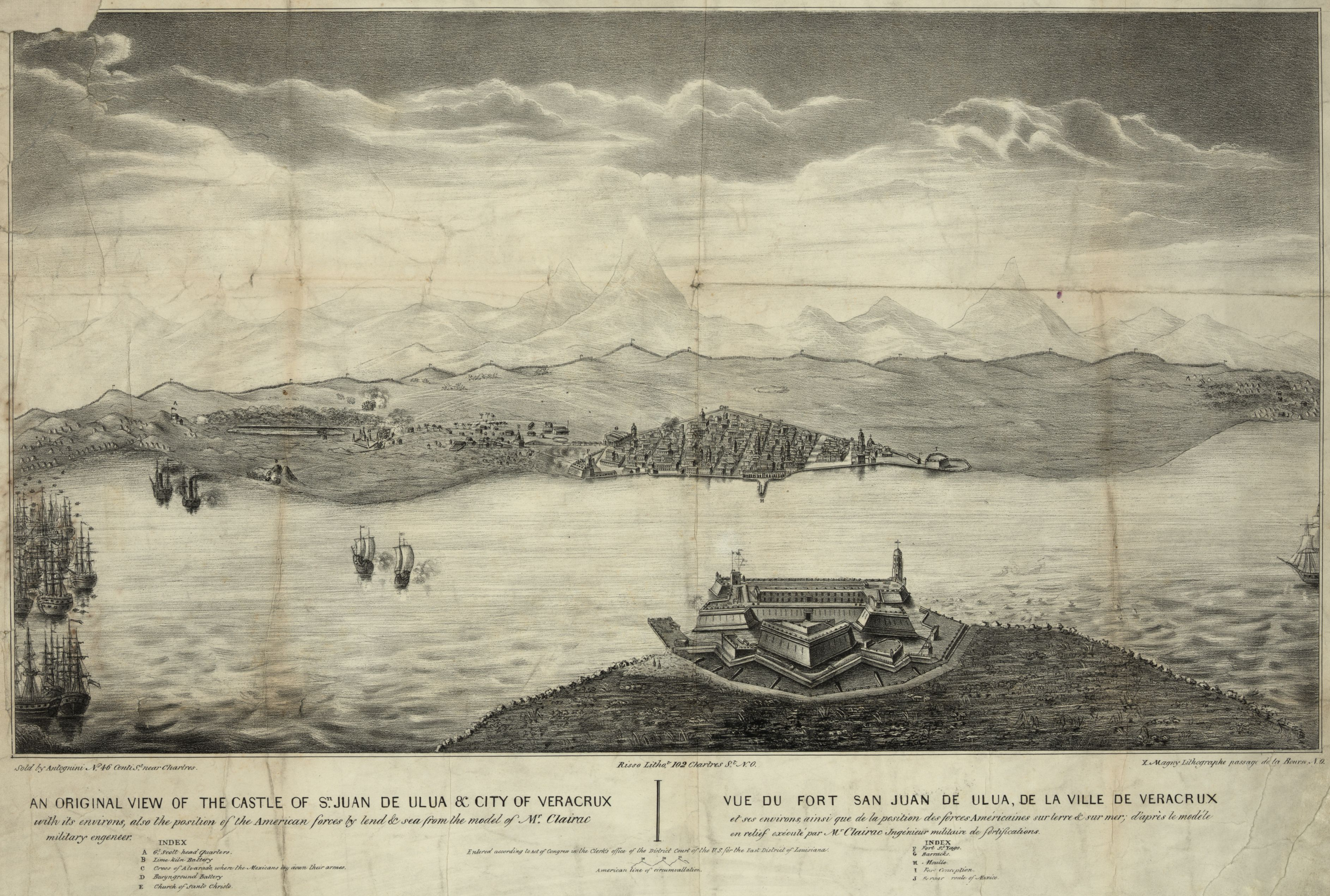
Old view of San Juan de Ulúa

After the Spanish bombardment of the port, the Mexican government resolved to end the Spanish assaults. Although Mexico lacked a proper navy, on October 8, 1823, a blockade of San Juan de Ulúa was planned. Secretary of War and Navy José Joaquín de Herrera made a speech before the First Congress of Mexico expressing the urgency of acquiring more warships to blockade and attack the Spanish troops who occupied the fortress.

On January 28, 1825, General Francisco Lemaur was relieved of command of San Juan de Ulúa by José Coppinger. On July 27, 1825, the frigate captain Pedro Sainz de Baranda was appointed commander of the Navy in the port of Veracruz; he immediately began the reorganization of the squadron commissioned to blockade San Juan De Ulúa.

The blockade was successful, and compelled the Spanish forces, who received little aid from Havana, to surrender. Coppinger requested the suspension of hostilities and negotiations for the surrender of his forces. The fighting, begun on October 26, 1821, was concluded by the Mexican Navy when it defeated the last Spanish stronghold in Mexico on November 23, 1825.

== Protection of the seas and ambitions in Cuba ==
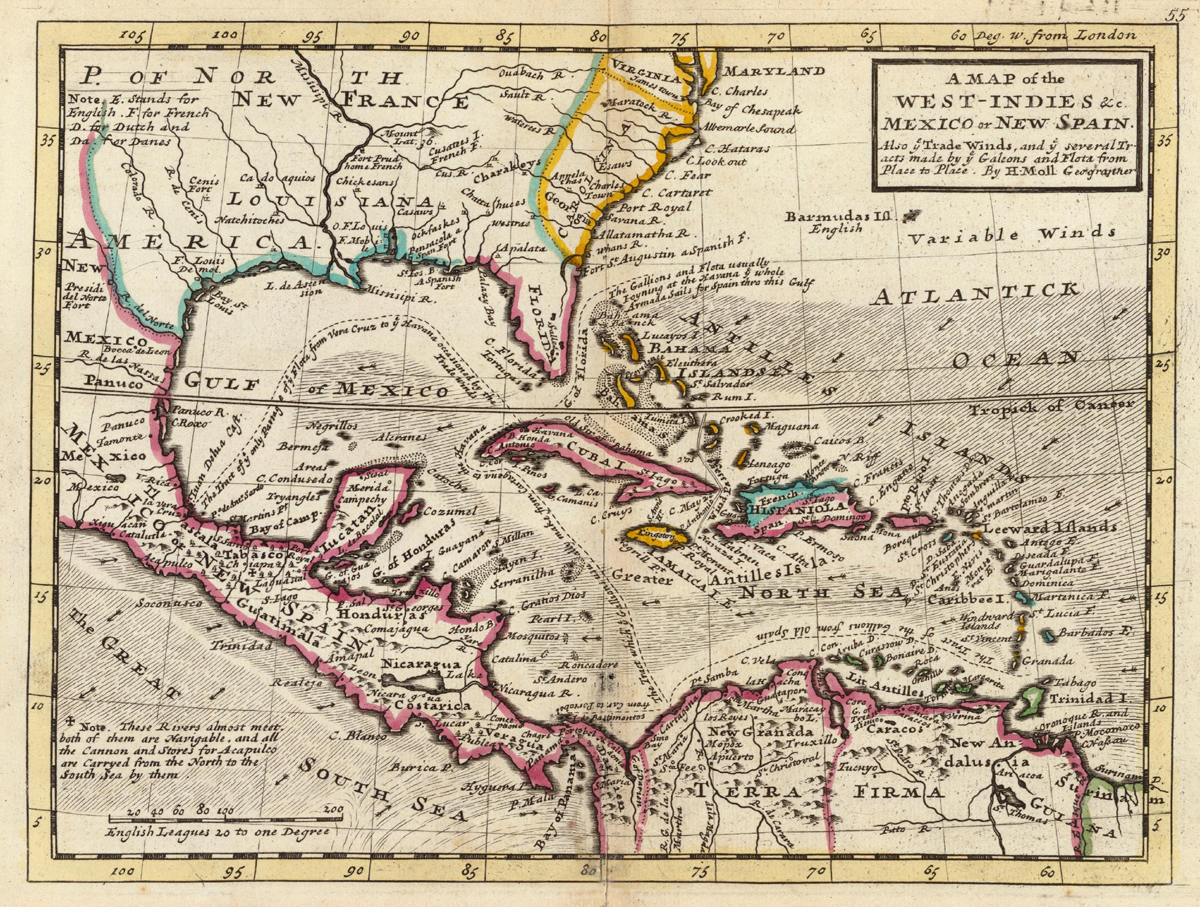
Map of the West Indies, with Cuba in the center, drawn by Herman Moll in 1736.

Despite the victory of Mexico over the last Spanish bastion in Ulúa, Spain refused to recognize the Treaty of Córdoba and hence the independence of Mexico.

The Mexican government, led by Guadalupe Victoria, came to the conclusion that Spain, by its refusal to recognize the treaties, still posed a threat, and could use Cuba as a platform to launch a campaign to recover Mexico. Lucas Alamán, who was then the Mexican Minister of Foreign Affairs, assessed the threat posed by the military forces stationed in Cuba to Mexico. Since 1824, Alaman had held the belief that Mexico should seize Cuba, arguing that "Cuba without Mexico is aimed at imperialist yoke; Mexico without Cuba is a prisoner of the Gulf of Mexico." He believed that the Mexican forces, with the support of foreign powers such as France or Britain (which would be the first European power to recognize the independence of Mexico on July 16, 1826), could overcome the Spanish in Cuba.

The United States insisted upon the retention of Cuba by the Spanish government. To advance its ambitions to control the island and to prevent Spanish reconquest of the mainland, the Mexican government employed Commodore David Porter of the United States to command the Mexican navy in an attack on the maritime lines of Spain patrolling the island of Cuba. This was an effort to protect the Mexican territorial sea and ensure the continued success of its independence movement on all fronts. Thus began patrols of the Mexican squadron in Spanish waters, which culminated in the unsuccessful Battle of Mariel on February 10, 1828, in which Porter commanded the brig Guerrero, mounting 22 guns, and one of the finest vessels in the small Mexican Navy. Porter's son, midshipman David Dixon Porter, later a Union hero of the American Civil War, was slightly wounded. He was among the survivors who surrendered and were imprisoned in Havana until they could be exchanged. Commodore Porter chose not to risk his son again, and sent him back to the United States by way of New Orleans.

== Battle of Tampico ==
One year after the Battle of Mariel, there was a new attempt at reconquest by Spain, from Cuba, confirming the suspicions of the Mexican authorities. Spain appointed Gen. Isidro Barradas, who left the port with 3,586 soldiers with the name "Spearhead Division" and on July 5, went to Mexico. The fleet consisted of a flagship, called the Sovereign, two frigates, two gunships and 15 transport ships, commanded by Admiral Laborde.

On July 26, 1829, the fleet arrived in Cabo Rojo, near Tampico (State of Tamaulipas), and from there began its operations on the 27th, trying to land 750 troops and 25 boats. The expedition began their advance towards Tampico while the boats were moored at the Pánuco River. The Battle of Pueblo Viejo, which took place on September 10-11, marked the end of the Spanish conquest attempts in Mexico. General Isidro Barradas signed the capitulation of Pueblo Viejo, in the presence of generals Antonio Lopez de Santa Anna, Manuel de Mier y Terán, and Felipe de la Garza.

On December 28, 1836, Spain recognized the independence of Mexico under the Santa María–Calatrava Treaty, signed in Madrid by the Mexican Commissioner Miguel Santa María and the Spanish state minister José María Calatrava. Mexico was the first former colony whose independence was recognized by Spain; the second was Ecuador on February 16, 1840.

== See also ==
- History of Mexico
- List of wars involving Mexico
- Mexican War of Independence
- Reconquista (Mexico)
- Spanish American wars of independence
- Spanish occupation of the Dominican Republic

== Sources ==
- GONZÁLEZ PEDRERO, Enrique (1993) País de un solo hombre: el México de Santa Anna México, ed.Fondo de Cultura Económica, ISBN 978-968-16-3962-4 URL accessed September 27, 2009
- Instituto Nacional de Antropología e Historia, Consejo Nacional para la Cultura y las Artes, Asociación de amigos del Museo Nacional de las Intervenciones, Museo Nacional de las Intervenciones (2007) Las intervenciones extranjeras en México 1825-1916, Cuernavaca, ed. Servicios Gráficos de Morelos, ISBN 978-968-03-0283-3
- RUIZ GORDEJUELA URQUIJO, Jesús (2006) La expulsión de los españoles de México y su destino incierto, 1821-1836 Sevilla, ed.Universidad de Sevilla ISBN 978-84-00-08467-7 URL accessed September 27, 2009
- SIMS, Harold (1984) La reconquista de México: la historia de los atentados españoles, 1821-1830, México, ed. Fondo de Cultura Económica, URL accessed September 27, 2009
- SIMS, Harold (1990) The Expulsion of Mexico's Spaniards, 1821–1836, University of Pittsburgh Press.
