= José Arizabalo =

Spanish military officer

Jose Antonio Arizabalo Orobio (Gipuzkoa, around 1784 - after 1834) was a Spanish military who played an important role in the Spanish American wars of independence.

== Biography ==
Still a child, at the age of seven, he moved with his family to Venezuela, Arizabalo began his military career in Puerto Rico as Artillery commander. From Puerto Rico went to Santo Domingo in 1809 to fight the French.

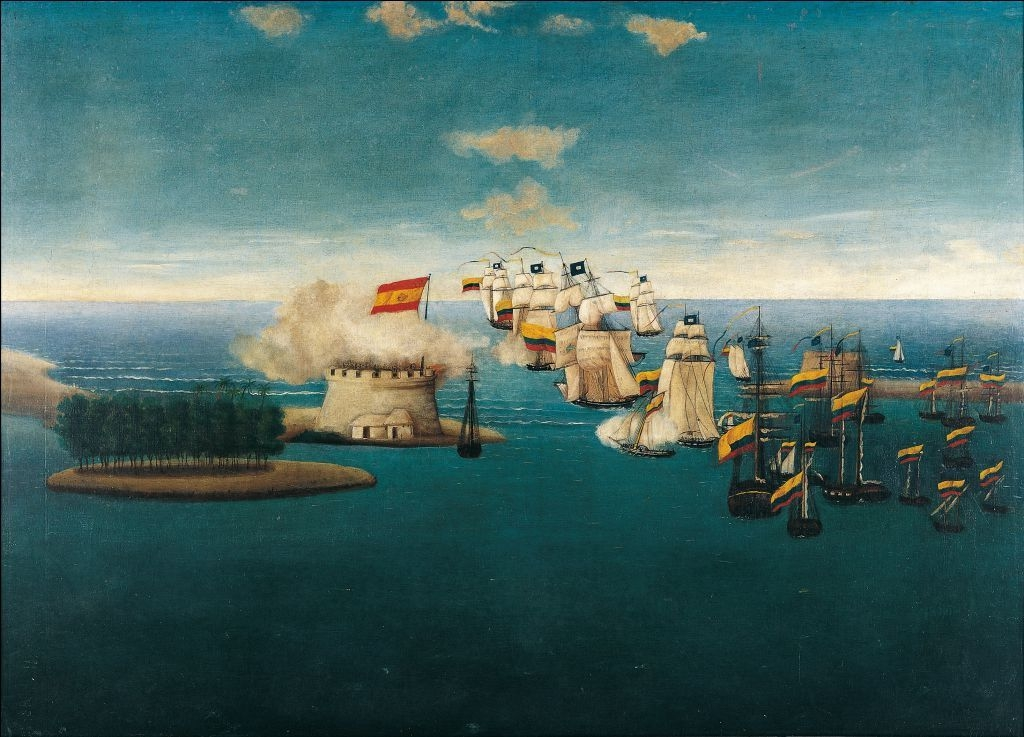
Battle of Lake Maracaibo - 1823

Already lieutenant, he left Santo Domingo in October 1813, and joined the Artillery unit of Caracas. He arrived in Puerto Cabello, in March 1814, coinciding with the siege of Puerto Cabello where his grandfather died. He was in La Guaira, Cumana and Maracaibo, where he fought against the Patriots. In 1819 he was 35 years of age, and as lieutenant colonel of infantry and artillery commander of Fort San Carlos de la Barra in Lake Maracaibo, participated in the capitulation of Francisco Tomás Morales after the Battle of Lake Maracaibo (1823). He was banished to Puerto Rico, with the rest of the Royalist troops in Venezuela.

From Puerto Rico he returned secretly to Venezuela between 1827 and 1829 and organized a guerrilla with the title of commanding general of the Royalist troops "Costa Firme". With little or no support from the Spanish Caribbean fleet of Angel Laborde, based in Puerto Rico which was ruled by Miguel de la Torre, finally on 18 August 1829, without any hope of success, and after spending many hardships, Joseph Arizabalo capitulated to Republican General Lorenzo Bustillos, being reshipped in La Guaira.

An other Royalist guerrilla band continued to fight under command of the indigenous leader José Dionisio Cisneros, who since 1821 had separated his band from the regular troops, and fought until capitulation to Paez in the year 1831. When King Fernando VII died in 1833, all projects of Spanish reconquest of Venezuela came to an end.

== See also ==
- Royalist (Spanish American Independence)
