= Sebastián Kindelán =

Spanish army officer and governor (1757–1826)

Field Marshall Sebastián Kindelán

47th Governor and Capitan a guerra of Santiago de Cuba
- In office 28 March 1799 – 10 July 1810
- Monarchs: Charles IV; Ferdinand VII
- First Secretary of State: Mariano Luis de Urquijo; Pedro Cevallos Guerra; Gonzalo O'Farrill y Herrera; Pedro Cevallos Guerra; Eusebio Bardají Azara; Francisco de Saavedra; Nicolás Ambrosio Garro y Arizcun
- Viceroy of New Spain: Miguel José de Azanza; Félix Berenguer de Marquina; José de Iturrigaray; Pedro de Garibay; Francisco Javier de Lizana y Beaumont; Pedro Catani
- Captain General of Cuba: Juan Procopio Bassecourt; Salvador José de Muro
- Preceded by: Isidoro de Limonta
- Succeeded by: Pedro Alcántara Suárez de Urbina

6th Governor of Spanish East Florida
- In office 11 June 1812 – 3 June 1815
- Monarch: Ferdinand VII
- First Secretary of State: Carlos Martínez de Irujo; Pedro Gómez Labrador (as interim); Antonio Cano Ramírez de Arellano (as interim); Juan O'Donoju (as interim); José Luyando (as interim); José Miguel de Carvajal-Vargas; Pedro Cevallos Guerra
- Secretary of State for Overseas Governance: Tomás González Calderón; Ciriaco González Carvajal (as interim); José Limonta(as interim); Manuel Antonio de la Bodega y Mollinedo; Miguel de Lardizabal
- Secretary of State for the Indies: Miguel de Lardizabal
- Viceroy of New Spain: Félix María Calleja del Rey
- Captain General of Cuba: Juan Ruiz de Apodaca
- Preceded by: Juan José de Estrada
- Succeeded by: Juan José de Estrada

4th Governor of Santo Domingo
- In office 24 September 1818 – 16 May 1821
- Monarch: Ferdinand VII
- First Secretary of State: Carlos Martínez de Irujo; Manuel González Salmón; Joaquín José de Melgarejo; Juan Jabat Aztal (as interim); Evaristo Pérez de Castro; Joaquín Anduaga Cuenca; Francisco de Paula Escudero; Eusebio Bardají y Azara
- Secretary of State for the Indies: Antonio González Salmón; Antonio Porcel Román; Ramón Gil de la Cuadra; Antonio de Guilleman (as interim); Ramón Olaguer Feliú
- Viceroy of New Spain: Juan Ruiz de Apodaca
- Preceded by: Carlos de Urrutia y Matos
- Succeeded by: Pascual Real

71st Governor of Cuba
- Interim; 19 July 1822 – 2 May 1823
- Monarch: Ferdinand VII
- First Secretary of State: Francisco Martínez de la Rosa; Evaristo Fernández de San Miguel (as interim from 28 February 1822); José Manuel de Vadillo (as interim)
- Secretary of State for the Indies: Manuel de la Bodega Mollinedo; Diego Clemencín; José Manuel de Vadillo
- Preceded by: Nicolás de Mahy y Romo
- Succeeded by: Francisco Dionisio Vives

Personal details
- Born: Sebastián de Kindelán y Oregón; 30 December 1757 Ceuta, Spain
- Died: 4 May 1826 (aged 68) Santiago de Cuba, Cuba, Spanish Empire
- Relations: Jean de Kindelan (brother); María de la Concepción Kindelán y O'Regan (sister)
- Parent(s): Vicente Kindelán Luttrell (father); María Francisca O’Regan (mother)
- Profession: Military governor, political administrator
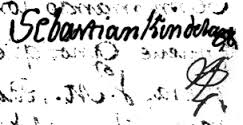
- Signature

Military service
- Allegiance: Spain
- Branch/service: (Spain) Spanish Army
- Years of service: 1768–1826
- Rank: Field Marshall
- Battles/wars: War of 1812: Patriot War

Sebastian Kindelán y O'Regan, also called Sebastián de Kindelán y Oregón, (30 December 1757 – 4 May 1826) was a colonel in the Spanish Army who served as governor of East Florida (11 June 1812 – 3 June 1815) and of Santo Domingo during the Second Spanish period (1818–1821), as well as provisional governor of Cuba (1822–1823).

== Biography ==
=== Early years ===
Sebastián Kindelán was born on 30 December 1757 in Ceuta, Spain. He was the son of Vicente Kindelán Luttrell of Luttrellstown and María Francisca O’Regan. His father was an Irishman who settled in Spain and joined the infantry of the Royal Spanish Army, attaining the positions of Brigadier and military governor of Zamora. His mother came from Barcelona but she probably was of Irish descent. He had a brother, Juan de Kindelán y O'Regan, and a sister, María de la Concepcion Kindelán y O’Regan. Kindelán joined the Spanish Army as a cadet on 18 November 1768. During this time he was a soldier of the infantry regiment of Santiago de Cuba.

=== Political career ===
Kindelán assumed the governorship of Santiago de Cuba and all the eastern territory of Cuba on 28 March 1799 during a politically sensitive period of the island's history. In a missive dated 19 February 1804, some of its influential citizens reported to the Spanish Crown the dangerous situation of the island, asserting that Governor Kindelán had encouraged white refugees from the uprisings in Saint-Domingue to settle in Cuba after the French withdrew from the western portion of Hispaniola. They complained that some twenty thousand or more French immigrants had already acquired land in Cuba, and were importing black slaves to work their plantations. The letter accused the governor of irreligion and dishonesty, and condemned him for having licentious habits and setting a bad example for the people. Kindelán rebutted the denunciations vigorously, and defended the French settlers, saying they were peaceful, and had no intention of inciting a revolution such as had occurred in Santo Domingo (Saint-Domingue).

In a letter to the authorities in Spain dated 17 May 1804, Kindelán made note of recent attacks on the British colonies by privateers based in Cuba. He later requested a reassignment, and was transferred to East Florida on 22 September 1811. He was promoted to Brigadier of Infantry in December of that year. On 11 June 1812, Kindelán was officially named Royal Governor of Spanish East Florida, being named by the Cádiz Regency. In 1812 a group of filibusters from the United States tried to seize Florida, in what would become known as the Patriot War. The Seminoles and their black tribal members, some of them enslaved, came to the aid of Spain. Kindelán was so upset over the actions of the filibusters that he prepared to challenge President James Madison to a duel but was stopped by the Captain-General of Cuba.

Governor Kindelán sent certain leaders of his black militiamen to meet with the Seminole chiefs King Payne and his successor Bowlegs, who allowed some of their warriors to fight alongside the Spanish as a gesture of goodwill. Kindelán expressed his satisfaction when Bowlegs took two hundred of his men to join the Spanish at the St. Johns River, but complained that every time the Seminoles captured a slave, a horse or anything else of value, they left the field to try to secure the catch in their villages, so their utility as fighters was only temporary. Like his predecessors, Gov. Kindelán used black translators, including the free mulatto militiaman, Benjamin Wiggins, and the slave Tony Doctor (Antonio Proctor), whom he described as "known to be the best interpreter of Indian languages in the province", to promote a Spanish, Black, and Indian alliance. In July 1812, Proctor traveled to the Seminole town of Alachua to meet with the chief King Payne, who called upon several hundred of his warriors to assist the Spanish.

Kindelán left the position of Governor of East Florida on 3 June 1815, when he was appointed Attaché to the General Staff of Cuba, but on 12 August that same year he was given the rank of Lieutenant in Havana. Three years later, in 1818, he was elected acting governor of the Second Spanish Colony of Santo Domingo. As governor, he was faced with the problem of the Haitians who wanted to take over that part of the island of Hispaniola. On 12 September 1819, Kindelán was awarded the Grand Cross of San Fernando, third class, for his efforts in Florida in 1813 to stop the American attacks in the colony; he was also a Knight of the Order of Santiago.

Kindelán was replaced by Brigadier Pascual Real as colonial governor of Santo Domingo in 1821, prior to the short-lived independence of that colony won by José Núñez de Cáceres and his group. In 1822, as Cabo Subalterno, he was appointed Provisional Captain-General (or Governor) of Cuba to replace former Gov. Nicolás Mahy y Romo. Like his predecessor, Kindelán strove to unite the military and civil power in the office of the Captain-General; this effort aroused antagonism between the Spanish troops and the local militia. Between 1824 and 1826 he served as Field marshal (Mariscal de Campo) of the royal army, and died in Santiago de Cuba on 4 May 1826, with that rank.

== Personal life ==
Kindelán married Ana Manuela Mozo de la Torre Garvey in the Cathedral of Santiago de Cuba on 11 December 1801. The couple had six children: Juan (born in Santiago de Cuba on 8 September 1806), Bárbara, Vicente (1808–1877), Fernando (1808–1889), María (1810–1879) and Mariana (1810–1880).

== See also ==
- Flight of the Wild Geese
