= Isidro Barrada =

Spanish general who attempted to reconquer Mexico (1782-1835)

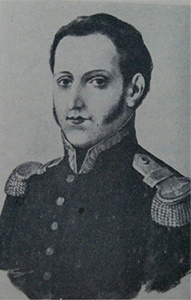
Isidro Barrada

Isidro Plácido Del Rosario Barrada y Valdés (Puerto de la Cruz, Tenerife, 6 October 1782 – Marseille, France, 14 August 1835) was a Spanish general sent to Mexico in 1829, eight years after Mexican independence in an ultimately unsuccessful attempt to reconquer the country for the Spanish Crown.

== South-America ==
Born in Tenerife, he moved as a child with his parents to Venezuela. They lived in Carúpano on the Venezuelan Caribbean coast. When the Venezuelan War of Independence broke out, he sided with the Royalists. He fought in many battles. He was also present in the Battle of Boyacá from where he managed to escape with 270 of his men. He fled to Cartagena de Indias, which he helped to defend against the Siege of Cartagena of 1820–21.

After the surrender of Cartagena de Indias, he was transported to Cuba, where he reached the rank of Colonel in 1824 and Brigadier General in 1828. He was also appointed Governor of Santiago de Cuba in 1824.

== Expedition to Mexico (1829) ==
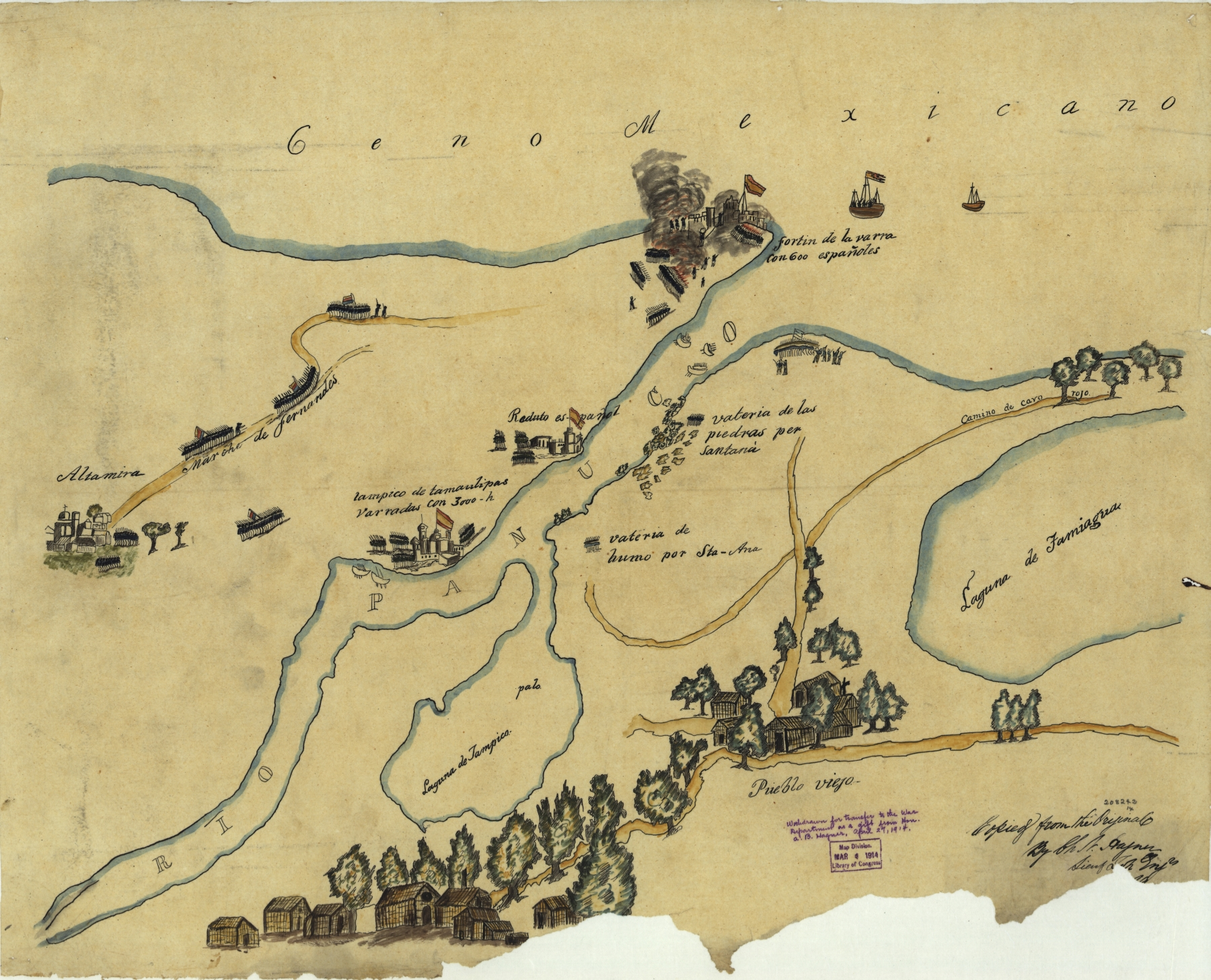
Map of the fighting (click to expand)

=== Background ===
The General Law of Expulsion was promulgated in Mexico in 1827. This law ordered the expulsion of all foreigners from the country, particularly all Spaniards. In January 1829, Feliciano Montenegro, Mexican counsel in New Orleans, informed his government that a Spanish expeditionary force was being assembled in Havana, with the objective of reconquering Mexican territory.

=== Preparations ===
Spanish Brigadier Isidro Barradas arrived secretly in Havana from Spain on June 2, 1829. He assembled an expedition of 3,000 to 4,000 men, and on July 5 he sailed for Mexico. The fleet included one ship of the line, El Soberano, 2 frigates, 2 gunboats and 15 transports. Admiral Ángel Laborde was in command of the fleet. The expedition included many of the Spaniards exiled in 1827 who wanted to return to the country. The exiles had convinced Barradas that Mexico was eager to return to Spanish sovereignty.

Barradas was apparently a disagreeable person, quarreling with Admiral Laborde and generally disliked by the troops under his command.

Three days out of Havana, the fleet was dispersed by a violent storm in the Bay of Campeche. The rallying point was the Isla de Lobos (Veracruz), but the weather made it difficult to reassemble. The frigate Amalia and four transports arrived there on July 14. More ships arrived in the following week. By July 22, nearly all had reached the reassembly point. One transport with 400 troops was forced to go to New Orleans for repairs.

=== Invasion of Mexico ===
On July 26 the fleet arrived off Cabo Rojo, near Tampico. On the 27th the first operation began, with 25 skiffs and 750 men, but the surf did not allow them to land. Admiral Laborde had to offer one ounce of gold to any man who would swim to shore for fresh news about the state of defense the country was in.

Eugenio Aviraneta e Ibargoyen accepted. He took 12 ounces of gold and a bottle containing proclamations. Once ashore, he spoke to four Indigenous Huastecos. They told him that there were no troops near about, but that General Lagarza was in Tampico with a thousand troops to guard against a possible uprising by Antonio López de Santa Anna. Aviraneta was informed that Lagarza did not know of the arrival of the Spaniards. He paid his informants three ounces of gold. They told him the best place to disembark but refused to accompany him to Tampico, fearing reprisals.

The disembarkation began at 2:00 that afternoon, at the place pointed out by the Huaxtecos. The force began marching toward Tampico, and the Spanish ships were sent to the Río Pánuco.

On the 31st the first fight with Mexican forces occurred, at Los Corchos, 20 km southeast of Pueblo Viejo, Veracruz.

Meanwhile, Santa Anna had been preparing for the expedition, and had assembled 1,000 infantrymen, 500 cavalry, four pieces of artillery and a fleet of 3 brigs, 4 schooners and 5 boats. Santa Anna did not attempt a direct assault, but rather laid siege to Barradas's forces.

=== Surrender ===
On September 11, 1829, Barradas, cut off from supplies and with his troops weakened by disease, signed the Capitulation of Pueblo Viejo with Santa Anna and General Manuel de Mier y Terán. Santa Anna was hailed as the savior of the Republic. This was the final consummation of Mexican independence.

President Vicente Guerrero had sent Santa Anna to oppose the Spanish, and he also sent Vice-President General Anastasio Bustamante to Jalapa in reserve to oppose any other Spanish landing along the coast. Bustamante took that opportunity to lead his troops in revolt and overthrow Guerrero.

== Later life ==
Defeated in the Battle of Tampico, Barrada traveled to New Orleans and then went to New York, from where he headed to Le Havre aboard the Packet boat Francisco I. He arrived in France on 2 February 1830, continued to Paris, and intended to travel to the Spanish Court from there. But in Paris, he learned that an order had been issued for him to be detained in Spain and transferred to Cuba, to be tried for treason. He therefore decided to remain in Paris.

He never returned to Spain again, living in poverty in France. He had a son in 1831 and moved to Marseille where he died from disease in the Rue Glandeves 1, on 14 August 1835.

== See also ==
- Mexico–Spain relations
