= Melitón Pérez del Camino =

Spanish Navy squad leader (1772–1845)

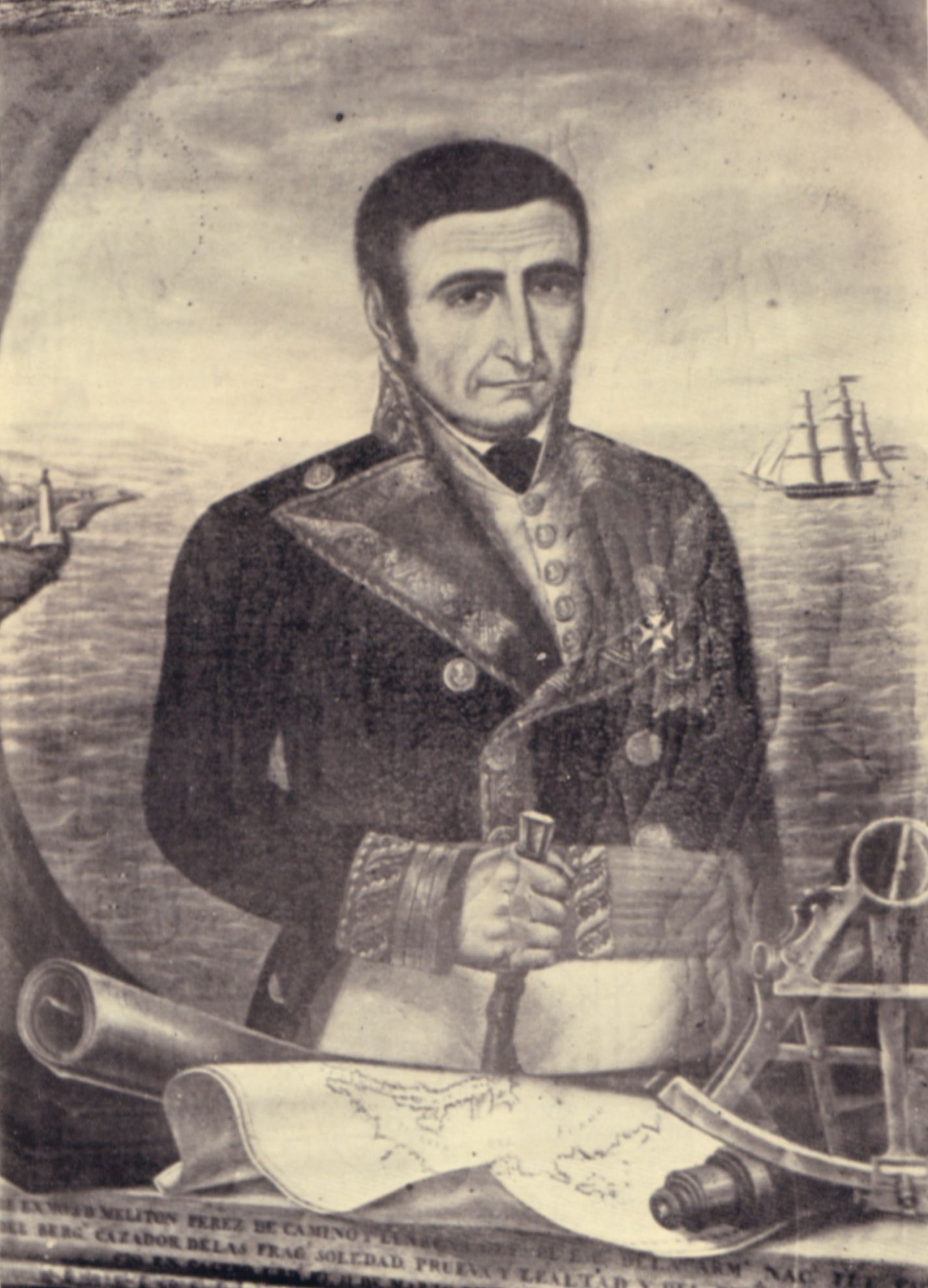
- Born: March 10, 1772; Castro Urdiales, Cantabria, Spain
- Died: March 6, 1845 (aged 72) Ferrol, Galicia, Spain
- Allegiance: Spanish Empire
- Branch: Spanish Navy
- Service years: 1789–1843
- Rank: Captain general of the Royal Spanish Navy
- Conflicts: French Revolutionary Wars; Napoleonic Wars
- Awards: Grand Laurelled Cross of San Fernando (Spain)

Melitón Pérez del Camino y de Llarena (March 10, 1772 – March 6, 1845) was a squad leader of the Royal Spanish Navy.

== Early life ==
Melitón Pérez del Camino was born in Castro Urdiales in Cantabria, Spain on March 10, 1772. He was the son of Joseph Antonio Pérez del Camino Peñarredonda and Cathalina Elena de Llarena y De la Quadra. On April 14, 1789, he enlisted as a Midshipman in the department Ferrol.

== 1790s ==
In 1793, on board a ship of the fleet of Francisco de Borja, he took part in the conquest of the islands of San Pedro and San Antiochus, as well as protection operations of the army, on the banks Var, during the war against France. On December 15 of that year (1793), he embarked aboard the San Juan Nepomuceno, the general squad Langara. The ship arrived at the Siege of Toulon and he helped protect the places Balaguer Fort with boats of his ship. On the 17th he helped in the masterful evacuation of the square, led by General Ignacio María de Álava.

He also served at the siege of Rosas, in command of smaller vessels, which held various battles against the army of the French republic.

Signed the Peace of Basel in 1796, thus ending the war against France, he shipped to North America, carrying the news of the outbreak of hostilities against the United Kingdom. The fifth day of October 1802, he was promoted to Frigate Lieutenant, landed in Ferrol on his return from United States.

== 1800s ==
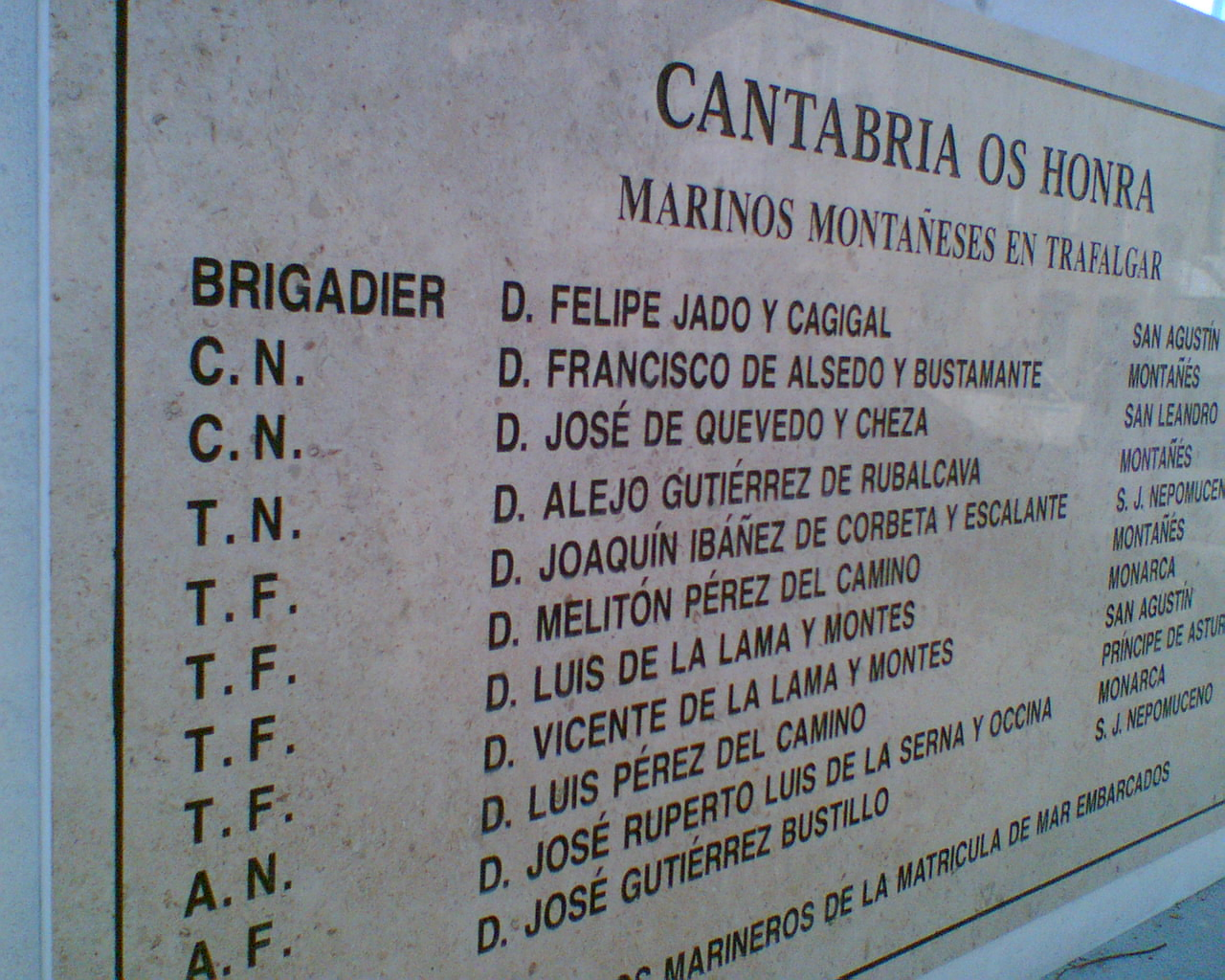
Monument dedicated to the memory of the Illustrious Mountain Sailors who participated in the Battle of Trafalgar located in Santander

At the end of 1804, again declared war on the United Kingdom, and Pérez del Camino embarked in the ship Montañés, Grandallana general's squad, which was to join the Franco-Spanish fleet of Villeneuve and Gravina. They went towards Cádiz, in August 1805.

On October 21 he participated in the battle of Trafalgar, in that the ship Montanes Alsedo lost its commander and much of the crew. This could not reach Cádiz, due being very badly treated.

On November 9, Pérez del Camino was promoted to Lieutenant. He continued in the brackets of General Alava and Apodaca and he went to fight the British Army that blocked the port of Cádiz. In this arsenal, he participated in the actions of June 1808, which gave the result of the surrender of the French fleet of Admiral Rosily, earning well, the medal of Distinction. Then he was sent to Ferrol, where he was given the command of a gunboat he used to defend the plaza, blocking the French attacks. When he had he opportunity, as he turned to the department of Cádiz, where he obtained the command of the brig Hunter, because this war was poor in naval action, he asked and obtained a pass from the battalions of Marines, where he was employed in places of greatest danger.

== 1810s ==
On May 24 of 1811, he was promoted to captain of a Frigate, continuing in office on the waterfront of Cádiz. On August 25 of 1812, he was in front of some gun-boats in the occupation of the Castle of Santa Catalina, attacking the positions of Napoleon Bonaparte that were in retreat. He deposed the authorities appointed by the invaders, for which he was awarded the Laureate Cross of Saint Ferdinand. On October 22 the year of 1812, he embarked as deputy Inspector General of the fleet of John J. Martínez. In March 1813, he was sent to the department of Ferrol, where he was appointed first assistant and interim general most Major General. On April 30 of 1816, Pérez del Camino obtained the command of the Fragata Proserpina (frigate Proserpine) and soon after he got the command of the frigate Soledad. With this ship, which was part of the division of Brigadier Rodriguez Arias, he sailed for the Mediterranean Sea, carrying out a Diplomatic mission to the regencies of Algiers, Tunis and Tripoli. On April 20 of year 1819, commanded the Frigate Test, which belonged to the division of the ships San Telmo and Alexander I and made the voyage to the port of Callao in Lima area. Of these only the Frigate Test ship reached its destination because the ship Alexander I, by its inability to withstand the sea had to make return to the port of Cádiz, and San Telmo, was wrecked near Cape Horn, Chile. On 5 November 1820, when he was aboard the frigate Esmeralda in the port of Callao, this was captured by insurgents in Peru. Pérez del Camino, as head chief of round, personal fought in battle against multiple enemies, finally being defeated and taken prisoner after being wounded twice.

== 1820s ==
On April 19 of 1822, he was traded, returning to the arsenal of Cádiz in the British frigate Patrick. He obtained the command of the Frigate Loyalty, and together with Iberia, Perla (Pearl) and the brig Vencedor, they forming a division under his command. He made the crossing of the Atlantic Ocean on a mission of protecting a convoy bound for Havana. The following year, as Commander-in-chief of the Naval Station in Havana he took part in operations carried out by Brigadier Ángel Laborde. In the opening of Charleston, where he had led the forces, unleashed a violent storm that ripped almost all ships. In February 1829, he turned over command of the frigate Loyalty, and was assigned to the squadron tank and he returning shortly after to department of Ferrol. On December 6 of that same year he was promoted to brigadier and was given the task to review the naval thirds Coast. On the death of Ferdinand VII, and after civil war started, he was appointed commander of a naval division, dedicated to blocking the Cantabrian coast, to try to prevent the arrival of resources to the Carlist.

== 1830s ==
On February 25 of 1835, he was named a member of the Senior Government Board of the Royal Navy. In October 1836, he was entrusted the office of the general command of the department of Ferrol, having been appointed General José Pascual de Zayas y Chacón, Acting Captain General of Galicia. He served in this location until January 26, 1837. In December 1838, he returned to take over the commanding general of the department, having been appointed Minister Marina Chacón. The year April 27, 1839, he was promoted to squad leader.

== 1840s ==
In 1841, he was named a member of the governing board of military pawnshop shortly after the Admiralty. In 1843, he was dissolved by the Admiralty and was replaced by the Directorate-General and Majority of the Navy, so he ended his charge, who so brilliantly occupied. In this same year he was appointed in property, commander of the department of Ferrol. He died in this place, in office, the sixth day of March 1845.
